= List of built-in macOS apps =

This is a list of built-in apps and system components developed by Apple for macOS that come bundled by default or are installed through a system update. Many of the default programs found on macOS have counterparts on Apple's other operating systems, most often on iOS and iPadOS.

Apple has also included versions of iWork, iMovie, and GarageBand for free with new device activations since 2013. However, these programs are maintained independently from the operating system itself. Similarly, Xcode is offered for free on the Mac App Store and receives updates independently of the operating system despite being tightly integrated.

== Applications ==
=== App Store ===
The Mac App Store is macOS's digital distribution platform for macOS apps, created and maintained by Apple based on the iOS version, the platform was announced on October 20, 2010, at Apple's "Back to the Mac" event. First launched on January 6, 2011, as part of the free Mac OS X 10.6.6 update for all current Snow Leopard users, Apple began accepting app submissions from registered developers on November 3, 2010, in preparation for its launch. After 24 hours of release, Apple announced that there were over one million downloads.

=== Automator ===
Automator is an app used to create workflows for automating repetitive tasks into batches for quicker alteration via point-and-click (or drag and drop). This saves time and effort over human intervention to manually change each file separately. Automator enables the repetition of tasks across a wide variety of programs, including Finder, Safari, Calendar, Contacts and others. It can also work with third-party applications such as Microsoft Office, Adobe Photoshop or Pixelmator.

=== Books ===
Books, previously known as iBooks, is an eBook reading application first released with OS X Mavericks. It allows users to read and purchase digital books, as well as listen to audiobooks. Reading goals can be set which encourage users to read for an amount of time each day.

=== Calculator ===
Calculator is a basic calculator application made by Apple and bundled with macOS. It has three modes: basic, scientific, and programmer. Basic includes a number pad, buttons for adding, subtracting, multiplying, and dividing, as well as memory keys. Scientific mode supports exponents and trigonometric functions, and programmer mode gives the user access to more options related to computer programming.

The Calculator program has a long history going back to the very beginning of the Macintosh platform, where a simple four-function calculator program was a standard desk accessory from the earliest system versions. Though no higher math capability was included, third-party developers provided upgrades, and Apple released the Graphing Calculator application with the first PowerPC release (7.1.2) of the Mac OS, and it was a standard component through Mac OS 9. Apple currently ships a different application called Grapher.

Calculator has Reverse Polish notation support, and can also speak the buttons pressed and result returned.

=== Calendar ===
Calendar, previously known as iCal before OS X Mountain Lion, is a personal calendar app made by Apple, originally released as a free download for Mac OS X v10.2 on September 10, 2002, before being bundled with the operating system as iCal 1.5 with the release of Mac OS X v10.3. It tracks events and appointments added by the user and includes various holidays depending on the location the device is set to as well as birthdays from contacts. Users are also able to subscribe to other calendars from friends or third-parties.

iCal was the first calendar application for Mac OS X to offer support for multiple calendars and the ability to intermittently publish/subscribe to calendars on WebDAV servers. Calendar also offers online cloud backup of calendars using Apple's iCloud service, or it can synchronize with other calendar services, including Google Calendar and Microsoft Exchange Server.

=== Chess ===
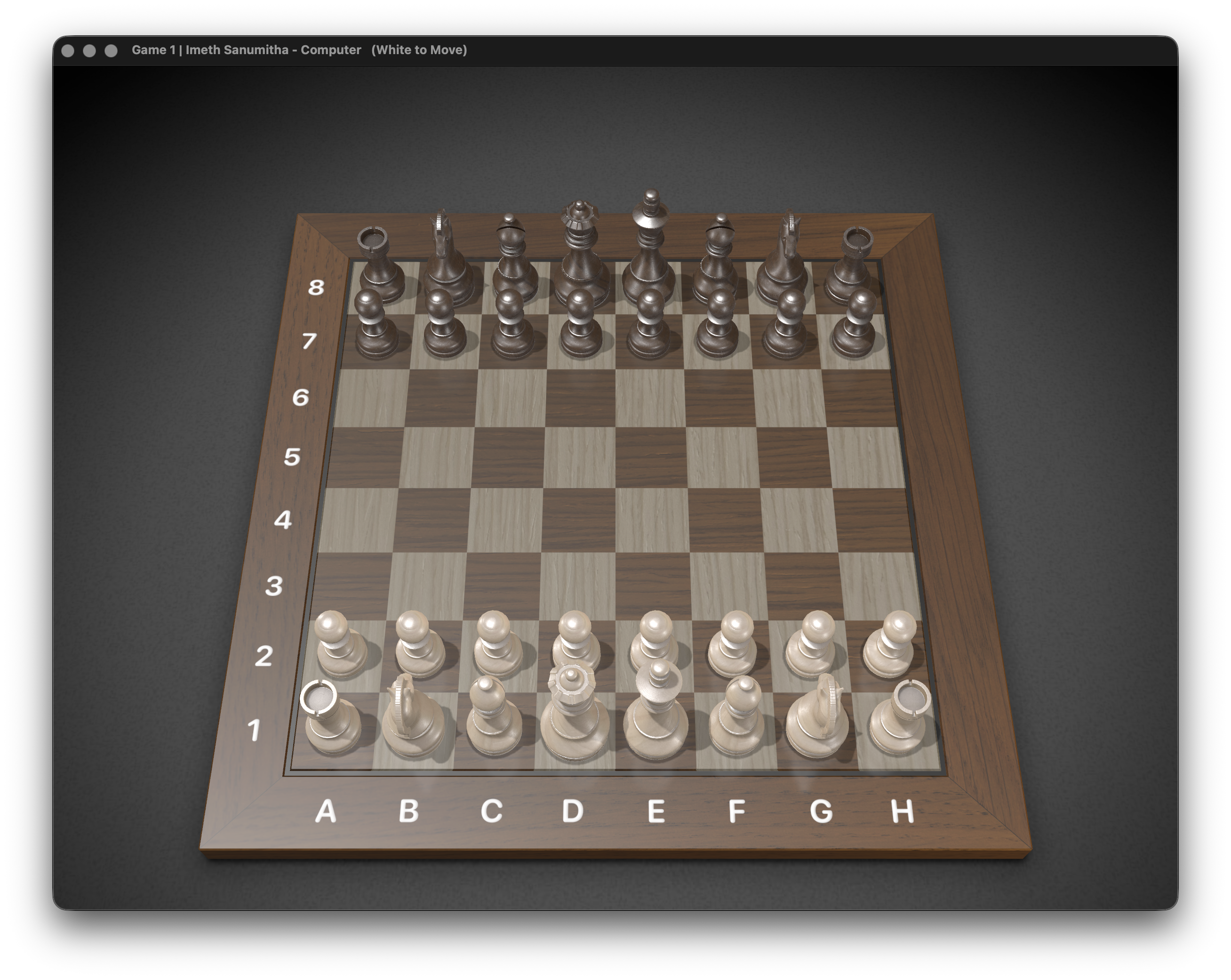
Screenshot of Apple Chess

Chess is a 3D chess game for macOS, developed by Apple as a fork of GNOME Chess (formerly "glChess"). Its history dates back to NeXTSTEP 1.0 released in September 1989. It supports chess variants such as crazyhouse and losing chess. Apple redistributes the source code under its own Apple Sample Code License, after a special permission has been granted from the original authors of GNOME Chess (which is licensed under GPL3). Apple also ships the game with the Sjeng chess engine (GPL).

=== Clock ===
Clock is a timekeeping app first made available in macOS Ventura. It allows users to view the current time in locations around the world, set alarms and timers, and use their phone as a stopwatch. Alarms and timers will play a chime once completed, which the user can choose from their ringtone library.

=== Contacts ===
Contacts, previously known as Address Book before OS X Mountain Lion, is a computerized address book. Contacts can be synchronized over iCloud and other online address book services and allows for the storage of names, phone numbers, email addresses, home addresses, job titles, birthdays, and social media usernames.

=== Dictionary ===
Dictionary is an application introduced with OS X 10.4 that provides definitions and synonyms from various sources, serving as a built-in dictionary and thesaurus. The program also includes definitions for a list of Apple-related terms as well as access to Wikipedia articles. Dictionary supports several languages and currently provides American-English definitions from the New Oxford American Dictionary and Oxford American Writer's Thesaurus.

=== FaceTime ===
FaceTime is a videotelephony app introduced in Mac OS X 10.6.6, replacing the video and audio calling functionality of iChat on Mac. Users can also make standard phone calls through the FaceTime app if a connected iPhone under the same Apple ID is nearby. In 2018, Apple added group video and audio support to FaceTime which can support up to 32 people alongside the release of macOS Mojave.

With the release of macOS Monterey, Apple introduced a feature called SharePlay, which allows users to simultaneously watch videos, listen to music together, or share their display.

=== Find My ===
Find My is an app and service that enables users to track the locations of iOS, iPadOS, macOS, watchOS, AirPods and AirTags via iCloud. Introduced in macOS Catalina, it replaces Find My Mac and Find My Friends from previous versions. Missing devices can be made to play a sound at maximum volume, flagged as lost and locked with a passcode, or remotely erased. Users are also able to share their GPS locations with friends and family who own Apple devices of their own and can set notifications for when a person arrives or leaves a destination.

=== Font Book ===
Font Book is a font manager first released with Mac OS X Panther in 2003. It allows users to browse and view all fonts installed on device, as well as install new fonts from .otf and .tff files. A font can be selected to see its alphabets, complete repertoire of characters, and how it sets a sample text of the user's choice.

=== Freeform ===
Freeform is a virtual brainstorming app first made available on alongside macOS 13.1. It allows users to create canvases called "boards", which can display a range of inputs including text notes, photos, documents, and web links. The app offers real-time collaboration between users, with support for FaceTime and iCloud syncing.

=== Home ===
Home is a smart-home management app released with macOS 10.14 Mojave, that serves as the front-end for Apple's HomeKit software framework. It lets users configure, communicate with, and control their HomeKit enabled smart appliances from a single application. Appliances can be divided into separate rooms and access to home controls can be shared with others.

=== Image Capture ===
Image Capture is an application that enables users to upload pictures from digital cameras or scanners which are either connected directly to their computer or network. It provides no organizational tools like Photos but is useful for collating pictures from a variety of sources with no need for drivers.

=== Mail ===
Mail is an email client first originating in NeXTstep, before being carried over to Mac OS X. It is preconfigured to work with popular email providers, such as Yahoo! Mail, AOL Mail, Gmail, Outlook and iCloud (formerly MobileMe) and supports Exchange. Mail includes the ability to read and write emails, file emails into folders, search for emails, automatically append signatures to outgoing emails, filter out junk mail, and automatically unsubscribe from newsletters.

=== Maps ===
Maps is a web mapping app and service introduced to macOS with OS X Mavericks. It provides directions and estimated times of arrival for automobile, pedestrian, cycling and public transportation navigation. Apple Maps features a Flyover mode that enables a user to explore certain densely populated urban centers and other places of interest in a 3D landscape composed of models of buildings and structures, as well as Look Around, which allows the user to view 360° street-level imagery.

=== Messages ===
Messages is an instant messaging app introduced with OS X, replacing the messaging component of iChat in prior versions while providing support for the iMessage protocol from iOS. A number of upgrades have been introduced to the iMessage platform over time, including message effects, editing and deleting messages within a fifteen-minute window, and a dedicated iMessage App Store which allows users to download sticker packs that can be sent in conversations.

=== Music ===
Music is a media player introduced macOS Catalina, replacing the music-playing capabilities of iTunes. It can play music files stored locally on devices and allows users to curate their song library into playlists. Songs can be purchased directly from the iTunes Store or streamed through Apple Music if the user has an active subscription. Internet radio stations can also be found within the app, with both local and international broadcasters available. Music supports lossless and spatial audio, and is capable of video playback, used primarily for music videos, artist interviews, and live performances.

=== News ===
News is a news aggregator introduced in selected regions with the release of macOS Mojave 10.14. Users can read news articles with it, based on publishers, websites and topics they select, such as technology or politics. On March 25, 2019, Apple News+ was made available within the News app, which is a subscription service allowing access to content from a number magazines and newspapers.

=== Notes ===
Notes is a notetaking app introduced with OS X Mountain Lion. It functions as a service for making text notes and sketches, which can be synchronised between devices using Apple's iCloud service. Notes features support for advanced text formatting options, several styles of lists, rich web and map link previews, support for more file type attachments, a corresponding dedicated attachment browser, and a system share extension point for saving web links and images.

=== Passwords ===
Passwords is an app for managing passwords, introduced in macOS Sequoia. It replaces Keychain Access.

=== Photo Booth ===
Photo Booth is a camera application introduced on devices running Mac OS X Tiger with a built-in iSight camera, allowing users to take picture and video. Photo Booth displays a preview showing the camera's view in real time, while thumbnails of saved photos and videos are displayed along the bottom of this window, obscuring the bottom of the video preview. These can be shown or played by clicking on the thumbnails. Users can also apply a variety of effects to a photo, which act similarly to social media filters.

=== Photos ===
Photos is a photo management and editing application introduced with OS X Yosemite 10.10.3, replacing both iPhoto and Aperture. Photos is based on the rebuilt version of the in-built app released for iOS 8. The photos library is organized chronologically on a timeline, determined by the metadata attached to the photo. Photos can also be sorted manually into albums, searched by location or by tagged persons. Photos can be synced and backed up through the iCloud Photo Library and shared albums. Photos contains a number of simple editing tools which allow users to crop, rotate, and adjust their photos, with a limited number of editing tools available for videos.

=== Podcasts ===
Podcasts is a media player used for playing and subscribing to podcasts introduced in macOS Catalina to replace the podcasting capabilities of iTunes. Podcasts can be discovered and followed or subscribed to in the 'Browse' and 'Search' tabs, with the 'Listen Now’ tab showing new episodes of followed podcasts as they are made available. Podcast channels allow users to follow or subscribe to creators rather than individual shows.

=== Preview ===
Preview is an image and PDF viewer application, first originating in NeXTstep, before being carried over to Mac OS X. It is capable of viewing a number of viewing, printing, and editing a number digital image formats, as well as Portable Document Format (PDF) files. It employs the Quartz graphics layer, and the ImageIO and Core Image frameworks.

=== QuickTime Player ===
QuickTime Player is an application that can play compatible video and sound files. It is capable of limited editing features, including trimming video clips and exporting to one of four video resolutions or an audio-only format. QuickTime Player can also record video and audio from the device's camera and microphone, or record a user's display for screen recording.

=== Reminders ===
Reminders is a task-managing app introduced to OS X Mountain Lion and later rebuilt from the ground up in MacOS Catalina. The app allows users to create their own lists of reminders and set notifications for themselves. New reminders can be placed into lists or set as subtasks and can include several details including: a priority tag, a note about the reminder, and an image or URL attachment. Additionally, alarms can be set for reminders, sending a notification to users at a certain time and date, when a geofence around an area is crossed, or when a message starts being typed to a set contact.

=== Safari ===
Safari is a graphical web browser based on the WebKit engine, included with macOS since version 10.3 "Panther", where it replaces Internet Explorer for Mac OS X. Websites can be bookmarked, added to a reading list, or saved to the home screen and are synced between devices through iCloud. In 2010, Safari 5 introduced a reader mode, extensions, and developer tools. Safari 11, released in 2017, added Intelligent Tracking Prevention, which uses artificial intelligence to block web tracking. Safari 13 added support for Apple Pay, and authentication with FIDO2 security keys. Its interface was redesigned in Safari 15, including a new landing page.

=== Shortcuts ===
Shortcuts, formerly Workflow, is a visual scripting app that allows users to create macros for executing specific tasks on their device. These task sequences can be created by the user and shared online through iCloud. A number of curated shortcuts can also be downloaded from the integrated gallery.

=== Stickies ===
Stickies is a desktop note program first included in System 7.5, later being re-written in Cocoa during the transition to Mac OS X in 2001. It allows a user to put post-it note-like windows on the screen for to write short reminders, notes and other clippings. The ability to collapse note windows, which is present in all versions of Stickies, is a holdover from System 7.5's WindowShade feature. The window button layout, which is unusual for a modern macOS application, is retained from Mac OS 8.

=== Stocks ===
Stocks is a stock market tracking app introduced with macOS Mojave. It allows users to check financial data of any company publicly listed, including the current value of a company and their increase or decrease percentage. A graph shows the trends of each company over time, with a green graph showing positive growth and a red graph showing a decline. Business News is provided when a stock is not selected, which shows Apple News articles about companies a user is following.

=== System Settings ===
System Settings, formerly System Preferences, is an application included with macOS. It allows users to access information about their device and modify various system settings and options on their device such as the desktop wallpaper, screen saver, notifications, Wi-Fi and Bluetooth, display and brightness, keyboard and trackpad, accessibility features, and more. With the release of macOS Catalina, a Screen Time feature was introduced which is intended to help user's focus and combat screen addiction. Furthermore, macOS Monterey introduces Focus modes, which expand on Apple's previous Do Not Disturb feature to filter notifications during scenarios such as sleeping or working.

=== TextEdit ===
TextEdit is an open-source word processor and text editor, first featured in NeXT's NeXTSTEP and OPENSTEP. TextEdit has support for formatted text, justification, and even the inclusion of graphics and other multimedia elements, as well as the ability to read and write to different character encodings, including Unicode (UTF-8 and UTF-16). It automatically adjusts letter spacing in addition to word spacing while justifying text. TextEdit does not support multiple columns of text.

=== TV ===
TV, also known as Apple TV, is a media player introduced in macOS Catalina, replacing the video-playing capabilities of iTunes. The app can be used for viewing television shows and films purchased or rented through the iTunes Store, which can be accessed from within the app. It also houses original content from the Apple TV+ streaming service, and can even directly stream content from some third-party services through the a la carte video on demand "Apple TV Channels" service. The TV app can be used to index and access content from other linked video on demand services, allowing programs watched in other apps to appear in a user's Up Next feed, even if they are not subscribed through the Channels service. The TV app is also capable of broadcasting live sports and events, such as through the MLS Season Pass.

=== Voice Memos ===
Voice Memos is a voice recording app, introduced in macOS Mojave, designed for saving short snippets of audio for later playback. Saved voice memos can be shared as a .m4a file or can be edited, which allows parts of a recording to be replaced, background noise to be removed, or the length of a recording to be trimmed. Other playback options include the ability to change playback speed, skip silent parts of a memo, or enhance a recording. Audio files can also be organised into different folders.

=== Weather ===
Weather was introduced to macOS in macOS Ventura.

== Utilities ==
=== Activity Monitor ===
Activity Monitor is a system monitor for the macOS operating system, which also incorporates task manager functionality. Activity Monitor appeared in Mac OS X v10.3, when it subsumed the functionality of the programs Process Viewer (a task manager) and CPU Monitor found in the previous version of OS X. In OS X 10.9, Activity Monitor was significantly revamped and gained a fifth tab for "energy" (in addition to CPU, memory, disk, and network).

=== AirPort Utility ===
AirPort Utility is a program that allows users to configure an AirPort wireless network and manage services associated with and devices connected to AirPort Routers. It comes pre-installed on macOS, and is available to download for Microsoft Windows and iOS. AirPort Utility is unique in that it offers network configuration in a native application as opposed to a web application. It provides a graphical overview of AirPort devices attached to a network, and provides tools to manage each one individually. It allows users to configure their network preferences, assign Back to My Mac accounts to the network, and configure USB attached Printers and hard drives. The current versions are 6.3.6 for recent versions of macOS, 5.6.1 for Microsoft Windows and older versions of Mac OS X, and 1.3.4 for iOS.

On January 30, 2013, Apple released AirPort Utility 6.0 for macOS featuring a redesign of the user interface focused on increasing usability for novice users. Reception was mixed with some media outlets reporting IT professionals and network administrators being frustrated over some removed features. It was reported that most end users, however, would not notice the feature omissions. Users requiring the removed features can still access the previous version of AirPort Utility using a workaround.

Starting with macOS Golden Gate, AirPort Utility is no longer included in new installations of macOS.

=== Audio MIDI Setup ===
Audio MIDI Setup is a utility program that comes with the macOS operating system for adjusting the computer's audio input and output configuration settings and managing MIDI devices.

It was introduced in Mac OS X 10.5 Leopard as a simplified way to configure MIDI Devices. Users need to be aware that prior to this release, MIDI devices did not require this step, and mention of it might be omitted from MIDI devices from third-party manufactures.

=== Bluetooth File Exchange ===
Bluetooth File Exchange is a utility that comes with the macOS operating system, used to exchange files to or from a Bluetooth-enabled device. For example, it could be used to send an image to a cellphone, or to receive an image or other documents from a PDA.

=== Boot Camp Assistant ===
Boot Camp Assistant assists users with installing Windows on their Intel Mac using Boot Camp. It does not support Macs with Apple silicon processors, as Microsoft does not have a commercial version of Windows 10 that runs on ARM-based processors.

=== ColorSync Utility ===
ColorSync Utility is a macOS application used for management of color profiles and filters used in Apple's PDF workflows, or applying filters to PDF documents. The interface is composed of two parts, the document browser and the utility window. The document browser allows the user to zoom in and out of an image or apply a Filter to it. The utility window has several options, including Profile First Aid, Profiles, Devices, Filters and Calculator.

=== Console ===
Console is a log viewer developed by Apple and included with macOS. It allows users to search through all of the system's logged messages, and can alert the user when certain types of messages are logged. The Console is generally used for troubleshooting when there is a problem with the computer. macOS itself, as well as any applications that are used, send a constant stream of messages to the system in the form of log files. The console allows users to read the system logs, help find certain ones, monitor them, and filter their contents.

Clicking on "Show Log List" in the toolbar will bring up the Log List. The Log List opens a sidebar which shows all of the different logs that the system maintains. This list helps in viewing the many different logs maintained in various parts of the system by bringing them all together to one place. By clicking on a particular log category, all of the logs will be shown.

The System Log Queries contains all of the logs that have to do with the entire system. This includes system logs as well as individual application logs.

Selecting All Messages gives a live look at your computer's activities, updated live. This includes all activities from both the system as well as any applications running. Logs in this section of the Console are all formatted uniformly. They all include a timestamp, the name of the process or application, and the actual message of the log. When the message displayed includes a paperclip icon next to it, it means that it is a shortened version of a longer report, and clicking the icon will show the complete report.

In addition to viewing all messages, users can also create custom queries with any criteria that they like. These custom queries will filter the messages and will also be shown in the All Messages section. In order to make a new query, choose "New System Log Query" from the File menu.

=== Digital Color Meter ===
Digital Color Meter is a utility for measuring and displaying the color values of pixels displayed on the screen of a Macintosh computer.

The utility presents a "window" onto the screen which includes a cursor which by default is 1×1 pixel in size. The color displayed in that pixel is shown as a color value which may be represented as decimal or hexadecimal RGB triplets, CIE 1931, CIE 1976 or CIELAB triplets or a Tristimulus triplet. The displayed color could be copied either as a solid color or as the color value which represents it, to be used in other applications (for instance an RGB triplet may be used in a color specification to be used on a World Wide Web page).

=== Disk Utility ===
Disk Utility is a system utility for performing disk and disk volume-related tasks. It can create, convert, backup, compress, and encrypt logical volume images from a wide range of formats, mount or unmount disk volumes, verify a disk's integrity and repair it if damaged, and erase, format, partition, or clone disks.

=== Grapher ===
Grapher is a graphing calculator program introduced in Mac OS X Tiger that is able to create 2D and 3D graphs from simple and complex equations. Users edit the appearance of graphs by changing line colors, adding patterns to rendered surfaces, adding comments, and changing the fonts and styles used to display them. Grapher is able to create animations of graphs by changing constants or rotating them in space.

=== Keychain Access ===
Keychain is the encrypted password management system in macOS, introduced with Mac OS 8.6. A keychain can contain several types of data, including passwords, private keys, certificates, and secure notes.

=== Migration Assistant ===
Migration Assistant is a utility by Apple that transfers data, user accounts, computer settings and apps from one Macintosh computer to another computer, or from a full drive backup. As of OS X Lion and later, it can also migrate contacts, calendars, and email accounts and other files from Microsoft Windows. As of macOS Sequoia 15.4 and later, it is possible to set up a Mac using an iPhone or iPad. Migration Assistant can be used during initial setup of a new computer or run manually on a system that has already been set up. It may be used multiple times to copy only applications, user account(s), or settings. Its primary purpose is to duplicate the contents and configuration of an existing computer user account(s) on a new one.

The Migration Assistant does not transfer the operating system of the old computer to the new one. Similarly, applications and utilities bundled by Apple with the operating system (e.g. Safari) are not transferred, based on the assumption that the newer machine has the same or newer version already installed. However, settings for these applications (e.g. bookmarks) are transferred.

=== Print Center ===
Print Center is a utility that allows a user to view all current and pending jobs on any connected printers or fax machines. The program will open automatically when a job is sent from the device to a printer, and allows for pending jobs may to be paused or canceled. Furthermore, it is capable of displaying information about a connected printer including approximate ink supply levels and can open Image Capture if the printer or fax has a scanner attached.

=== Screen Sharing ===
Screen Sharing is a utility that may be used to control remote computers and access their files. To connect, one may enter a VNC or Apple ID and authenticate as a local user on the remote computer, or, if the computers are linked via the same Apple ID, automatically initialise the connection. It supports features such as a shared clipboard between the two computers and remotely transferring files. The feature must be enabled in the Sharing preference pane in System Settings.

=== Screenshot ===
Screenshot is an application introduced with macOS Mojave, replacing Grab which functioned similarly. The app allows for screen recording and taking screenshots, either for a single window, a selected portion of the screen, or the entire screen. Screenshot is initialized whenever the user presses the keyboard shortcuts ⌘ Cmd+⇧ Shift+3, ⌘ Cmd+⇧ Shift+4, ⌘ Cmd+⇧ Shift+5, or ⌘ Cmd+⇧ Shift+6.

=== Script Editor ===
Script Editor, known as AppleScript Editor starting in Snow Leopard up until Yosemite, is a code editor for the AppleScript and JavaScript for Automation scripting languages, included in classic Mac OS and macOS.

=== System Information ===
System Information, formerly System Profiler, is a software utility derived from field service diagnostics produced by Apple's Service Diagnostic Engineering team, at that time located in Apple satellite buildings in Campbell, California, that was bundled with the classic Mac OS since Mac OS 7.6 under the name Apple System Profiler. In Mac OS X 10.0, the first release of macOS, it was renamed System Profiler; with the release of Mac OS X 10.7 "Lion" it was again renamed to System Information. Other new features in Lion are the ability to look up support information for the user's hardware model as well. In OS X Mountain Lion and later versions of macOS users can also access System Information by holding down the option key and "System Information" will replace "About This Mac" in the Apple Menu.

It compiles technical information on all of the installed hardware, devices, drivers, applications, system settings, system software programs and kernel extensions installed on the host computer. It can export this information as plain text, RTF or in the plist XML format. This information is used to diagnose problems. System Profiler can be extremely useful if attempting to diagnose a hardware problem. A user can send the information directly to Apple if the user desires. It has support for scripting automation through AppleScript and some limited support in Automator.

System Information can also be accessed by using the "system_profiler" command through macOS's Terminal application.

=== Terminal ===
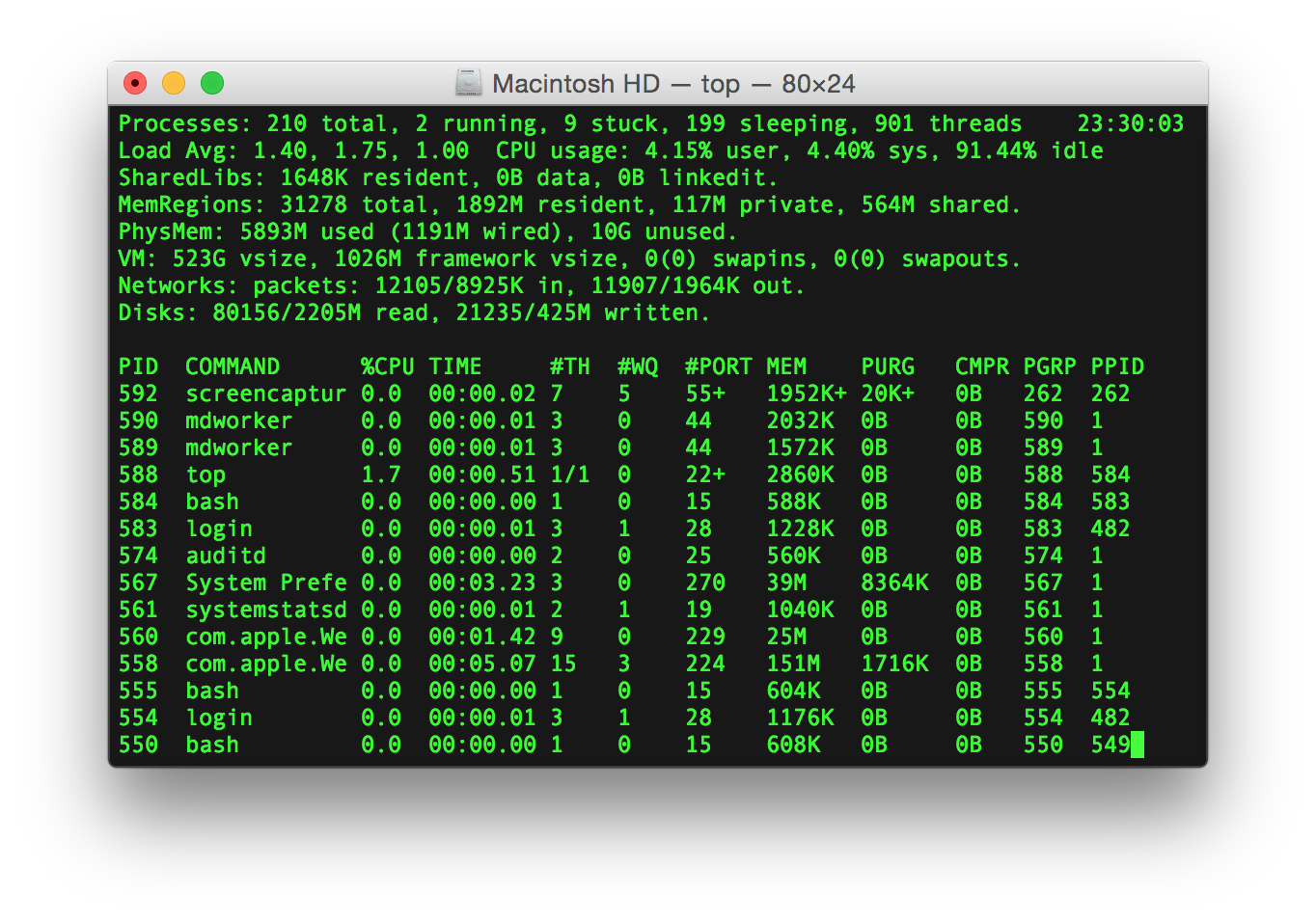
Terminal 2.11 running the top program under macOS

Terminal is a terminal emulator program, first originating in NeXTSTEP and OPENSTEP, before being carried over into Mac OS X. It provides text-based access to the operating system, in contrast to the mostly graphical nature of the user experience of macOS, by providing a command-line interface to the operating system when used in conjunction with a Unix shell, such as zsh (the default shell since macOS Catalina). The user can choose other shells available with macOS, such as the KornShell, tcsh, and bash.

=== VoiceOver Utility ===
VoiceOver Utility is a screen reader application which allows the user to listen to spoken directions from the computer, providing accessibility for blind and low-vision users. VoiceOver also includes support for many Braille displays. In addition, VoiceOver includes features for those that cannot use the mouse, such as keyboard-based navigation.

== Features ==
=== Control Center ===
Control Center provides access to system controls, such as Wi-Fi, Bluetooth, and Sound, in a unified interface accessible from the menu bar. Some of these controls can be added to the menu bar by dragging them from Control Center. Additional components can be added in System Settings. Available controls include:

- Wi-Fi
- Bluetooth
- AirDrop
- Focus
- Stage Manager
- Keyboard Brightness (available on MacBooks)
- Screen Mirroring
- Display
- Sound
- Now Playing
- Accessibility Shortcuts
- Battery (available on MacBooks)
- Fast User Switching

=== Dock ===
The Dock is the main method of launching and switching between applications; it is a component of the graphical interface shell of macOS. It can hold any number of items and resizes them dynamically to fit while using magnification to better view smaller items. By default, it appears on the bottom edge of the screen, but it can also instead be placed on the left or right edges of the screen if the user wishes.

=== Finder ===
Finder is the default file manager; it is a component of the graphical interface shell of macOS. It can be used to open files and launch other applications, and is responsible for the overall user management of files, disks, and network volumes. The Finder uses a view of the file system that is rendered using a desktop metaphor; that is, the files and folders are represented as appropriate icons. There is a "favorites" sidebar of commonly used and important folders on the left of the Finder window. Finder can also display previews of a range of files, such as images, applications and PDF files. The Quick Look feature allows users to quickly examine documents and images in more detail from the finder by pressing the space bar without opening them in a separate application.

Following the deprecation of iTunes, Finder is also now responsible for the backup and transfer of files to iPhone and iPad devices.

=== Launchpad ===
Launchpad is an application launcher that was introduced in OS X Lion. It displays all applications installed on the user's machine in a grid of icons, which can be put into folders. Launchpad provides an alternative way to start applications in macOS, in addition to other options such as the Dock, Finder, and Spotlight search. Launchpad can be used to uninstall apps that came from the Mac App Store.

The Launchpad was replaced in macOS Tahoe with an Applications interface, which integrates with Spotlight and categorizes apps into categories similar to the App Library on iOS and iPadOS.

=== Mission Control ===
Mission Control is a window management system and application introduced with the release of Mac OS X 10.7 Lion, combining the features of the previous Dashboard, Exposé, and Spaces programs. It allows a user to view and organise all open application windows at once, including the ability to move windows between different connected monitors and virtual desktops.

=== Notification Center ===
Notification Center displays notifications from apps and websites. Users access Notification Center by clicking the clock in the menu bar on macOS Big Sur or the Notification Center icon in earlier versions of macOS. Notification Center can be customized in System Settings.

=== Siri ===
Siri is a digital assistant introduced in macOS Sierra that allows the user to interact with it to ask questions, make recommendations, and perform actions either on the device or by delegating requests to a set of Internet services. With continued use, it adapts to users' individual language usages, searches, and preferences, returning individualized results.

=== Spotlight ===
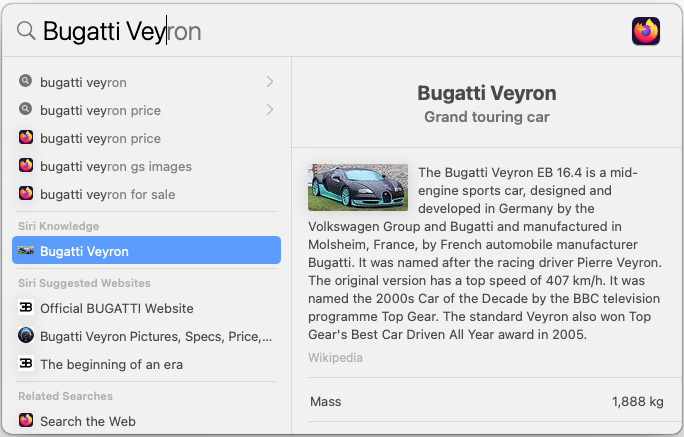
Spotlight in macOS Big Sur

Spotlight is macOS's selection-based search system, used for indexing documents, pictures, music, applications, and System Settings within the computer. In addition, specific words in documents and in web pages in a web browser's history or bookmarks can be searched. It also allows the user to narrow down searches with creation dates, modification dates, sizes, types and other attributes.

=== Time Machine ===
Time Machine is a backup mechanism introduced in Mac OS X 10.5 Leopard. It creates incremental backups of files that can be restored at a later date, and allows the user to restore the whole system or specific files. The software is designed to work with both local storage devices and network-attached disks, and is most commonly used with external disk drives connected using either USB or Thunderbolt.

== System components ==
=== Archive Utility ===
Archive Utility (BOMArchiveHelper until Mac OS X 10.5) is the default archive file handler in macOS. It is usually invoked automatically when opening a file in one of its supported formats. It can be used to create compressed ZIP archives by choosing "Create archive of 'file'" (Leopard: "Compress") in the Finder's File or contextual menu. It is located at /System/Library/CoreServices/Applications/Archive Utility.app in OS X 10.10 and later, /System/Library/CoreServices/Archive Utility.app in 10.5 through 10.9, and /System/Library/CoreServices/BOMArchiveHelper.app in 10.4. Prior to Archive Utility's inclusion in Mac OS X v10.3, beginning with Mac OS 7.6, Apple bundled the freeware StuffIt Expander with the operating system.

Invoking Archive Utility manually shows a minimal GUI letting the user change Archive Utility preferences or choose files to compress or uncompress.

BOM is an abbreviation of Bill of Materials. Bill of Materials files or .bom files are used by the macOS Installer program to document where files in an installer bundle are installed, what their file permissions should be, and other file metadata. Thus, a Bill of Materials is read by the Installer, and Archive Utility helps it by extracting the files specified in the BOM.

=== Crash Reporter ===
Crash Reporter is the standard crash reporter in macOS. Crash Reporter can send the crash logs to Apple for their engineers to review.

Crash Reporter has three modes of operations:

- Basic — The default mode. Only application crashes are reported, and the dialog does not contain any debugging information.
- Developer — In addition to application crashes, crashes are also displayed for background and system processes.
- Server — The default for macOS Server systems. No crash reports are shown to the user (though they are still logged).
- None — Disables the dialog prompt. Crash reports are neither displayed nor logged.

The developer tool CrashReporterPrefs can be used to change modes, as can using the terminal command defaults write com.apple.CrashReporter DialogType [basic|developer|server].

In basic mode, if Crash Reporter notices an application has crashed twice in succession, it will offer to rename the application's preference file and try again (corrupted preference files being a common cause of crashes).

When reporting a crash, the top text field of the window has the crash log, while the bottom field is for user comments. Users may also copy and paste the log into their e-mail client to send to a third-party application developer for the developer to use.

=== DiskImageMounter ===
DiskImageMounter is the utility that handles mounting disk volume images in Mac OS X, starting with version 10.3. DiskImageMounter works by either launching a daemon to handle the disk image or by contacting a running daemon and have it mount the disk.

Like BOMArchiveHelper, DiskImageMounter has no GUI when double-clicked; doing so does nothing. The only GUI the program ever displays is a window with a progress bar and mount options (cancel or skip verification) or an error report if it could not mount the image. It is found in /System/Library/CoreServices/DiskImageMounter.app.

Starting with version 10.7, Apple "removed double-click support for images using legacy metadata." DiskImageMounter will not be able to open .img (NDIF only), .smi (self mounting), .dc42 (Disk Copy 4.2), and .dart (DART) disk image formats that were previously supported in version 10.6 and earlier.

DiskImageMounter supports a variety of disk image file types:

- Apple Disk Image (.dmg, com.apple.disk-image)
- UDIF disk images (.udif, com.apple.disk-image-udif); UDIF segment (.devs, .dmgpart, com.apple.disk-image-udif-segment)
- self mounting image (.smi, com.apple.disk-image-smi)
- DVD/CD-R master image (.toast, .dvdr, .cdr, com.apple.disk-image-cdr, com.roxio.disk-image-toast)
- disk image segment (dmgpart)
- raw disk image (OSTypes: devr, hdrv, DDim, com.apple.disk-image-raw)
- PC drive container (OSTypes: OPCD, com.apple.disk-image-pc)
- ISO image (.iso, public.iso-image)
- sparse disk image (.sparseimage, com.apple.disk-image-sparse, .sparsebundle)

As of macOS 11.0, support for the following formats has been removed:

- Disk Copy 4.2 disk image (.dc42, .diskcopy42, com.apple.disk-image-dc42)
- DART disk image (.dart, com.apple.disk-image-dart)
- NDIF disk image (Note: Mac OS Classic legacy disk image format supported by DiskImageMounter under Mac OS X versions 10.3—10.6. As of version 10.9, hdiutil can still convert these formats but unable to open or write them, and version 11.0 removed all support.) (.ndif, .img, com.apple.disk-image-ndif); NDIF disk image segment (.imgpart, com.apple.disk-image-ndif-segment)

=== Directory Utility ===
Directory Utility is a utility included with the macOS (previously Mac OS X) operating system to configure connections to directory services. Prior to Mac OS X 10.5, this tool was named Directory Access. Apple's LDAP implementation is called Apple Open Directory.

=== DVD Player ===
DVD Player, formerly Apple DVD Player, is the default DVD player introduced in Mac OS X 10.1. It supports all the standard DVD features such as multiple audio, video & subtitle tracks as well as Dolby Digital 5.1 passthrough, DVD access URLs and closed captions. In some instances, users can choose which VOB file to open. DVD Player is also fully compatible with DVDs authored by DVD Studio Pro and iDVD, including HD DVDs by DVD Studio Pro. As of macOS Mojave, it has been updated to 64-bit, sports a new icon and has better Touch Bar support.

DVD Player complies with most copyright laws, and will thus enforce most restrictive measures of DVD technology, such as region-restrictive encodings and user-inhibited operations ("disabled actions"). It does this even when using an all-region DVD drive. It will even force Apple's Screenshot program to cease functioning through the Finder interface until the DVD Player application is quit, effectively preventing the user from taking screen captures of visual DVD content.

The software does not contain a DTS decoder, so DTS tracks cannot be played through the Mac's built in speakers or analog output. However, DTS tracks can be output to devices that have their own decoder, so playback is supported through outputs such as S/PDIF, DisplayPort and HDMI. It has never supported the ability to play Blu-Ray discs.

=== Feedback Assistant ===
The Feedback Assistant is made available to customers in the Apple Software Customer Seeding, AppleSeed for IT or Apple Beta Software programs and allows a user to manually send feedback, reports, or requests to Apple.

=== HelpViewer ===
Help Viewer is a WebKit based HTML viewer for macOS aimed at displaying help files and other documentation. It is found in /System/Library/CoreServices/Help Viewer.app. The default file extension is ".help". Help index files are generated with Help Indexer. macOS applications typically use Help Viewer to display their help content, rather than a custom system.

Help Viewer's implementation in Mac OS X 10.5 (Leopard) found its way to Rob Griffiths' list of Leopard criticisms, because Apple changed the software from a standalone application with a standard window interface to one with a floating window that always appears in front of all other application windows, obscuring the interface for which one is seeking help (see image below).

Although one can close or minimize the Help Viewer window, it is difficult to consult the Help Viewer while simultaneously working with the application, short of changing the size of windows so both fit on the screen. The Help Viewer window also does not work with the Exposé window management feature (Mission Control in OS X 10.7 or later). There is a workaround using the defaults command accessible in the Terminal.

=== Installer ===
Installer extracts and installs files out of .pkg packages, allowing developers to create uniform software installers.

Installer launches when a package or metapackage file is opened. The installation process itself can vary substantially, as Installer allows developers to customize the information the user is presented with. For example, it can be made to display a custom welcome message, software license and readme. Installer also handles authentication, checks that packages are valid before installing them, and allows developers to run custom scripts at several points during the installation process.

Installer packages have the file extension .pkg. Prior to Mac OS X Leopard, installer packages were implemented as Mac OS X packages. These packages were a collection of files that resided in folders with a .pkg file extension. In Mac OS X Leopard the software packaging method was changed to use the XAR (eXtensible ARchiver) file format; the directory tree containing the files is packaged as an xar archive file with a .pkg extension. Instead of distributing multiple files for a package, this allowed all of the software files to be contained in a single file for easier distribution with the benefit of package signing.

=== loginwindow ===
The loginwindow process displays the macOS login window at system startup if auto-login is not set, verifies login attempts, and launches login applications. It also implements the Force Quit window, restarts macOS user interface components (the Dock and Finder) if they crash, and handles the logout, restart, and shutdown routines.

Users are assigned their own loginwindow when they log in; if a loginwindow process belonging to a specific user is force quit, they will be logged out.

=== Software Update ===
Software Update is a section in System Settings for Mac Software Updates, as well as updates to core Mac apps, starting in macOS Mojave (10.14); it also has an item in the Apple menu. From OS X Mountain Lion (10.8) to macOS High Sierra (10.13), the Mac App Store was used for Software Updates; prior to that, Software Update was a separate utility, which could be launched from the Apple menu or from the Software Update pane in System Settings.

=== Other ===
Other system components include:

- About This Mac, which shows information about the Mac it is running on, such as the hardware, serial number, and macOS version.
- Captive Network Assistant, a daemon used to access captive portals when connected to public Wi-Fi networks.
- Certificate Assistant, a utility for creating and verifying digital certificates.
- ControlStrip, a daemon that controls the Touch Bar.
- CoreLocationAgent, a daemon responsible for displaying authorization prompts to allow apps and widgets to access location services.
- Expansion Slot Utility, a program that allows manual allocation of PCIe card bandwidth. It is only available on certain Mac Pro models.
- FolderActionsDispatcher, a daemon responsible for monitoring changes to the filesystem to run Folder Action scripts.
- Install Command Line Developer Tools, a utility that allows developers to easily install Xcode's command line developer tools if Xcode is not installed. It can be executed by running xcode-select --install in the terminal.
- iOS App Installer, an app that downloads .ipa files for iPadOS applications so that they can be run on Apple silicon-based Macs.
- Keychain Circle Notification, a daemon involved in iCloud Keychain syncing.
- ManagedClient manages various functions pertaining to managed preferences and configuration profiles.
- Setup Assistant is the application that starts on first boot of a fresh copy of macOS or a new Mac. It configures computer accounts, Apple ID, iCloud, and Accessibility settings. It is also run after major macOS system upgrades.
- OBEXAgent, a server that handles Bluetooth access.
- ODSAgent, a server that handles remote disk access.
- OSDUIHelper, a daemon that displays on-screen graphics when certain settings, such as volume or display brightness, are adjusted.
- PIPAgent, which manages the picture-in-picture feature available in macOS Sierra and later.
- Photo Library Migration Utility, which can migrate iPhoto and Aperture libraries to Photos.
- PowerChime, present on some MacBook models, plays a chime when the notebook is plugged in to power.
- ReportPanic, an app that displays a window when the system reboots from a kernel panic; it allows the user to send a report to Apple.
- screencaptureui, a daemon responsible for drawing the user interface shown when taking a screenshot.
- ScreenSaverEngine, the process that handles screen saver access. When invoked, it will display the screensaver.
- SystemUIServer, a daemon that manages status items in the menu bar.
- ThermalTrap, a daemon which notifies users when the system temperature exceeds a usable limit.
- Ticket Viewer, an app that displays Kerberos tickets.
- UnmountAssistantAgent, which displays a dialog if there is a process preventing ejection of a disk and offers to forcibly eject the disk if the process cannot be quit.
- Wireless Diagnostics, an app that launches when Wi-Fi connectivity problems are detected.

== Discontinued ==
=== Classic ===
JPEGView running in the Classic Environment

The Classic Environment, usually referred to as Classic, is a hardware and software abstraction layer in PowerPC versions of Mac OS X that allows most legacy applications compatible with Mac OS 9 to run on Mac OS X. The name "Classic" is also sometimes used by software vendors to refer to the application programming interface available to "classic" applications, to differentiate between programming for Mac OS X and the classic version of the Mac OS.

The Classic Environment is supported on PowerPC-based Macintosh computers running versions of Mac OS X up to 10.4 "Tiger", but not with 10.5 "Leopard" or Macintoshes utilizing any other architecture than PowerPC.

The Classic Environment is a descendant of Rhapsody's "Blue Box" virtualization layer, which served as a proof of concept. (Previously, Apple A/UX also offered a virtualized Mac OS environment on top of a UNIX operating system.) It uses a Mac OS 9 System Folder, and a New World ROM file to bridge the differences between the older PowerPC Macintosh platforms and the XNU kernel environment. The Classic Environment was created as a key element of Apple's strategy to replace the classic Mac OS (versions 9 and below) with Mac OS X as the standard operating system (OS) used by Macintosh computers by eliminating the need to use the older OS directly.

The Classic Environment can be loaded at login (for faster activation when needed later), on command, or whenever a Mac OS application that requires it is launched (to reduce the use of system resources when not needed). It requires a full version of Mac OS 9 to be installed on the system, and loads an instance of that OS in a sandbox environment, replacing some low-level system calls with equivalent calls to Mac OS X via updated system files and the Classic Support system enabler. This sandbox is used to launch all "classic" Mac OS applications—there is only one instance of the Classic process running for a given user, and only one user per machine may be running Classic at a time.

The Classic Environment can also be configured to show a window upon startup of the Classic Environment to simulate a computer booting into Mac OS 9. If the user chooses to launch the Classic Environment only when needed, launching a "classic" application first launches the Classic Environment, and then the application launches. When a "classic" application is in the foreground, the menu bar at the top of the screen changes to the older-style Mac OS menu bar. Dialog boxes and other user-interface elements retain their traditional appearance.

The Classic Environment also provides a way to run "Classic" applications on Apple's G5 systems as well as on most G4 based computers sold after January 2003. These machines cannot boot Mac OS 9 or earlier without the bridging capabilities of the Classic Environment or other software (see SheepShaver); in the former case, G5 Macs cannot run Mac OS 9 natively due to the lack of G5 processor support on Mac OS 9, while in the latter case, G4 Macs released from that point onwards cannot boot into Mac OS 9 natively because the "Mac OS ROM" boot files were not updated to support booting into Mac OS 9 directly from those Macs.

The Classic Environment's compatibility is usually sufficient for many applications, provided the application using it does not require direct access to hardware or engage in full-screen drawing. However, it is not a complete clone of Mac OS 9. The Finder included with Mac OS X v10.2 and later does not support the "Reveal Object" Apple events used by some Mac OS 9 applications, causing the "Reveal In Finder" functionality for those applications to be lost. Early releases of Mac OS X would often fail to draw window frames of Classic applications correctly, and after the Classic Environment's windowing was made double buffered in Mac OS X Panther, some older applications and games sometimes failed to update the screen properly, such as the original Macintosh port of Doom. On the other hand, the Classic Environment also "resurrected" some older applications that were previously made unusable on the Macintosh Quadra and Power Macintosh series; this is because Mac OS X replaced Mac OS 9's original virtual memory system with a more standard and less fragile implementation.

The Classic Environment's performance is also generally acceptable, with a few exceptions. Most of an application is run directly as PowerPC code (which would not be possible on Intel-based Macs). Motorola 68k code is handled by the same Motorola 68LC040 emulator that Mac OS 9 uses. Some application functions are actually faster in the Classic Environment than under Mac OS 9 on equivalent hardware, due to performance improvements in the newer operating system's device drivers. These applications are largely those that use heavy disk processing, and were often quickly ported to Mac OS X by their developers. On the other hand, applications that rely on heavy processing and which did not share resources under Mac OS 9's co-operative multitasking model will be interrupted by other (non-Classic) processes under Mac OS X's preemptive multitasking. The greater processing power of most systems that run Mac OS X (compared to systems intended to run Mac OS 8 or 9) helps to mitigate the performance degradation of the Classic Environment's virtualization.

=== Dashboard ===
Dashboard was an application for Apple's macOS operating systems, used as a secondary desktop for hosting mini-applications known as widgets. These were intended to be simple applications that launched quickly. Dashboard applications supplied with macOS included a stock ticker, weather report, calculator and notepad; users can create or download their own. Before Mac OS X 10.7 Lion, when Dashboard is activated, the user's desktop is dimmed and widgets appear in the foreground. Like application windows, they could be moved around, rearranged, deleted, and duplicated (so that more than one of the same Widget is open at the same time, possibly with different settings). New widgets could be opened via an icon bar on the bottom layer, loading a list of available apps similar to the iOS homescreen or the macOS Launchpad.

Dashboard was introduced in Mac OS X 10.4 Tiger. It could be activated as an application, from the Dock, Launchpad or Spotlight. It could also be accessed by a dashboard key. Alternatively, the user can choose to make Dashboard open on moving the cursor into a preassigned hot corner or keyboard shortcut. Starting with Mac OS X 10.7 Lion, the Dashboard can be configured as a space, accessed by swiping four fingers to the right from the Desktops either side of it. In OS X 10.10 Yosemite, the Dashboard is disabled by default, as the Notification Center is now the primary method of displaying widgets.

Dashboard was removed in macOS Catalina.

=== Grab ===
Grab was a built-in utility for taking screenshots. It supported capturing a marquee selection, a whole window, or the whole screen, as well as timed screenshots. The program originated from NeXTSTEP, and was replaced by the Screenshot utility in macOS Mojave. Grab saved screenshots in the TIFF format. It was also possible to save screenshots in PDF format (earlier versions of macOS) or PNG format (later versions).

=== iDVD ===
iDVD is a discontinued application that could be used to create DVDs.

=== Internet Connect ===
The Internet Connect program in Mac OS X allows the user to activate dial-up connections to the Internet via an ISP or VPN. It also provides a simple way to connect to an AirPort Network. Up to the latest version of Mac OS X 10.4, the Internet Connect application provides more general tools than the more detailed Network pane in System Settings, which allows the user to configure and control systemwide network settings. However, as of Mac OS X 10.5, Internet Connect's functions have been incorporated into the Network pane of System Settings, and the application is no longer included.

Use of Internet Connect is generally not necessary if the Macintosh is connected to the internet through an Ethernet device to DSL or cable internet service, except to manage connections to any subordinate bluetooth equipment.

=== iSync ===
iSync was a tool made to sync iCal and Address Book data to a SyncML-enabled mobile phone, via Bluetooth or by using a USB connection. It was released on January 2, 2003, with technology licensed from fusionOne. Support for many (pre-October 2007) devices was built-in, with newer devices being supported via manufacturer and third-party iSync Plugins. Support for Palm OS organizers and compatible smartphones was removed with the release of iSync 3.1 and Mac OS X 10.6 Snow Leopard. BlackBerry OS, Palm OS, and Windows Mobile (Pocket PC) devices could not be used with iSync, but were supported by third-party applications. Before the release of Mac OS X 10.4, iSync also synchronized a user's Safari bookmarks with the then usable .Mac subscription service provided by Apple.

=== iTunes ===
iTunes is a media player, media library, Internet radio broadcaster, mobile device management utility, and the client app for iTunes Store. It is used to purchase, play, download, and organize digital multimedia, on personal computers running the macOS and Windows operating systems. iTunes is developed by Apple. It was announced on January 9, 2001.

iTunes was criticized for having a bloated user experience. In 2019, Apple decided to split iTunes into separate apps as of macOS Catalina: Apple Music, Apple Podcasts, and Apple TV. Finder took over the device management aspect that iTunes previously served. This change would not affect Windows or older macOS versions.

=== Network Utility ===
Network Utility was an application for macOS up to macOS Catalina that provided a variety of tools that could be used related to computer network information gathering and analysis. Starting with macOS Big Sur the application is no longer included and was replaced with a message that it has been deprecated. Starting with macOS Ventura, the application is removed from the OS.

Network Utility showed information about each of your network connections, including the MAC address of the interface, the IP address assigned to it, its speed and status, a count of data packets sent and received, and a count of transmission errors and collisions. It also provided a GUI to the netstat, ping, traceroute, whois, finger, and stroke UNIX programs.

=== ODBC Administrator ===
ODBC Administrator was a 32-bit utility in the Mac OS X operating system for administering ODBC, which enables interaction with ODBC-compliant data sources. Features included connection pooling, trace log creation, and ODBC driver management, among other administration features.

Although Apple started including the underlying iODBC libraries in Mac OS X Jaguar, and continued to do so through at least macOS Big Sur, Apple only included their ODBC Administrator through Mac OS X Leopard, and temporarily made it available as a separate download (since removed) for Snow Leopard.

Alternatives to Apple's 32-bit ODBC Administrator include the free and open source 32-bit and 64-bit iODBC Administrator included with the iODBC SDK, which is available for all extant versions of Mac OS X (10.0.x through 11.2.x).

=== Printer Setup Utility ===
The Printer Setup Utility was an application that served to allow the user to configure printers physically connected to the computer, or connected via a network. The Utility provided more specific tools than the more user friendly printers pane in System Preferences. In Mac OS X 10.5 Leopard, the Printer Setup Utility was removed and its features placed in the Print & Fax System Preferences pane. Viewing individual printers' queues was moved to a Printer Proxy application.

=== Remote Install Mac OS X ===
Remote Install Mac OS X was a remote installer for use with MacBook Air laptops over the network. It could run on a Mac or a Windows PC with an optical drive. A client MacBook Air (lacking an optical drive) could then wirelessly connect to the other Mac or PC to perform system software installs.

Remote Install Mac OS X was released as part of Mac OS X 10.5.2 on February 12, 2008. Support for the Mac mini was added in March 2009, allowing the DVD drive to be replaced with a second hard drive.

With the launch of Mac OS X Lion, Apple has omitted Remote Install. A workaround is to enable Target Disk Mode.

=== Sherlock ===
Sherlock is a now-defunct file and web search tool created by Apple for the "classic" Mac OS, and carried through to early versions of Mac OS X. Sherlock was introduced in 1998 with Mac OS 8.5 as an extension of Finder's file searching capabilities. Like its predecessor—System 7.5’s revamped 'Find File' app, adapted by Bill Monk from his 'Find Pro' find program—Sherlock searches for local files and file contents on a Mac, using the same basic indexing code and search logic found in AppleSearch. Sherlock extended the system by enabling the user to search for items on the World Wide Web through a series of plug-ins, which employed existing web search engines. These plug-ins were written as plain text files, so that it was a simple task for a user to write a Sherlock plug-in.

Sherlock was replaced by Spotlight and Dashboard in 2005 with Mac OS X 10.4 Tiger, although Apple continued to include it with the default installation. Since most of the standard plug-ins for Sherlock provided by Apple itself no longer function, it was officially retired and removed in the release of Mac OS X 10.5 Leopard in 2007.

=== Software Update ===
In Mac OS 9 and early versions of Mac OS X, Software Update was a standalone tool. The program was part of the CoreServices in OS X. It could automatically inform users of new updates (with new features and bug and security fixes) to the operating system, applications, device drivers, and firmware. All updates required the user to enter their administrative password and some required a system restart. It could be set to check for updates daily, weekly, monthly, or not at all; in addition, it could download and store the associated .pkg file (the same type used by Installer) to be installed at a later date, and it maintained a history of installed updates. Starting with Mac OS X 10.5 Leopard, updates that required a reboot logged out the user prior to installation and automatically restarted the computer when complete. In earlier versions of OS X, the updates were installed, but critical files were not replaced until the next system startup.

Beginning with OS X 10.8, Software Update became part of the App Store application. Beginning with macOS Mojave (10.14), it became a part of System preferences.

=== X11 ===
In Mac OS X Tiger, X11 was an optional install included on the install DVD. Mac OS X Leopard, Snow Leopard and Lion installed X11 by default, but from OS X Mountain Lion (10.8), Apple dropped dedicated support for X11, with users directed to the open source XQuartz project (to which it contributes) instead.

== Development tools ==
- Apple Developer Tools
- Interface Builder
- Xcode
- Quartz Composer

== Server technology ==
- AppleShare IP Migration
- Fibre Channel Utility
- Gateway Setup Assistant
- Open Directory
- MySQL Manager
- QuickTime Broadcaster
- QuickTime Streaming Server
- RAID Admin
- Server Admin
- Workgroup Manager
- Xgrid

== Core components ==
- AppleScript
- Aqua
- Audio Units
- Bonjour
- Boot Camp
- Carbon
- Cocoa
- Core Animation
- Core Audio
- Core Data
- Core Image
- Core Video
- Darwin
- Mission Control
- Keychain
- OpenGL
- plist
- Quartz
- QuickTime
- Rosetta
- Smart folder
- Spaces
- WebKit
- XNU

== See also ==
- List of built-in iOS apps
- List of software by Apple
