= Quartz (disambiguation) =

Quartz is a common mineral.

Quartz may also refer to:

== Places ==
- Quartz, California, former settlement in Butte County
- Quartz Hill, California, an unincorporated community in Los Angeles County

== People ==
- Jakie Quartz, French singer

== Arts, entertainment, and media ==
=== Music ===
- Quartz (duo), dance music production team
- Quartz (British band), heavy metal band
- Qwartz Electronic Music Awards

=== Other arts, entertainment, and media ===
- Quartz (publication), a privately held global business news website
- Rose Quartz, character from the animated television series Steven Universe

== Computing ==
- Quartz (graphics layer), the graphics-rendering technology used in Mac OS X
- Quartz (scheduler), a Java Enterprise Job Scheduler
- Microsoft DirectShow, code name Quartz
- Microsoft Expression Web, code name Quartz
- Quartz 2D, an API on Mac OS X
- Quartz Compositor, the display server on Mac OS X
- UIQ, formerly User Interface Quartz, a discontinued software platform

== Technology ==
- Quartz (electronics), an electronic component
- Engineered quartz, a synthetic material used for countertops and the like, called "quartz" in the trade
- Quartz clock, a clock or watch using an oscillator regulated by a quartz crystal
