= Archive utility =

- For archive utility applications in general see file archiver.
- For the built-in macOS application see Archive Utility.
