= GLGE =

GLGE may refer to:

- Greenville/Sinoe Airport (ICAO code GLGE)
- GLGE (programming library)
