= Migration Assistant =

Migration Assistant may refer to:

- Migration Assistant (Apple), a utility that transfers data, user accounts, computer settings and apps from one Macintosh computer, or backup, to another computer
- Migration Assistant (Linux)
