= Implicit animation =

Implicit animation is a concept in user interface design in which animations can be programmed or styled within pre-existing constraints. It is distinct from explicit animation, which involves building the animation objects, setting their properties, and then applying those animation objects to the object which the designer wishes animated.

== Examples of use ==
- Apple Inc.'s Core Animation API
- CSS Transitions and Transforms in WebKit
