= Quartz 2D =

2D graphics rendering API

Quartz 2D is the native two-dimensional graphics rendering API for macOS and iOS platforms, part of the Core Graphics framework.

== Overview ==
Quartz 2D is available to all macOS and iOS application environments and provides resolution-independent and device-independent rendering of bitmap graphics, text, and vectors both on-screen and in preparation for printing. Its responsibilities within the graphics layer include:

- Rendering text
- Displaying, manipulating, and rendering PDF documents
- Converting PostScript data to PDF data, and vice versa
- Displaying, manipulating, and rendering bitmap images
- Providing color management via ColorSync
- Displaying the elements of the Aqua user interface

Because Quartz 2D is one of several Quartz Technologies, the term "Quartz" by itself must be taken in context.

== Drawing in Quartz 2D ==
Quartz 2D expands the drawing functions associated with QuickDraw. The most notable difference is that Quartz 2D eliminates output device and resolution specificity.

The drawing model utilized by Quartz 2D is based on PDF specification 1.4. Drawing takes place using a Cartesian coordinate system, where text, vectors, or bitmap images are placed on a grid. However, drawing output is not sent directly to the output device. Quartz 2D uses graphics contexts, environments in which drawing takes place. Each graphics context defines how the drawing should be presented: in a window, sent to a printer, an OpenGL layer, or off-screen. Each context rasterizes the drawing at the desired resolution without altering the data that defines the drawing. Thus, contexts are the mechanism by which Quartz 2D employs resolution- and device-independence. For example, a window context may rasterize an object to the appropriate screen resolution to create actual graphics on the display. The same object can be sent to a printing context at a much higher resolution. This permits the same graphics commands to yield output on any device using the most appropriate resolution.

== History ==
Quartz 2D is similar to NeXT's Display PostScript in its use of contexts. It first appeared as the 2D graphics rendering library called Core Graphics Rendering; along with Core Graphics Services (Compositing), it was wrapped into the initial incarnation of Quartz. Quartz (and its renderer) were first demonstrated at WWDC in May 1999.

Presently, the name Quartz 2D more precisely defines the 2D rendering capabilities of Core Graphics (Quartz). With the release of Mac OS X 10.2, marketing attention focused on Quartz Extreme, the composition layer, leaving the term "Quartz" to refer to the Core Graphics framework or just its 2D renderer. Presently, Quartz technologies can describe all of the rendering and compositing technologies introduced by macOS (including Core Image for example).

Prior to Mac OS X Tiger, QuickDraw rendering outperformed that of Quartz 2D. Mac OS X 10.4 rectified this, substantially increasing the standard rendering performance of Quartz 2D. Tiger also introduced Quartz 2D Extreme: optional graphics processor (GPU) acceleration for Quartz 2D, although it is not an officially supported feature. Quartz 2D Extreme is disabled by default in Mac OS X 10.4 because it may lead to video redraw issues or kernel panics. In Mac OS X Leopard, Quartz 2D Extreme was renamed QuartzGL.

== See also ==
- Quartz (graphics layer)
- Quartz Compositor
- QuickDraw
- Display PostScript
- Core Image
- Direct2D
