= Self-mounting image =

A self-mounting image is a disk image format, commonly found on the classic Mac OS platform, that is encapsulated in an application that mounts it as a file system. When downloaded from the Internet, they are often in a BIN, BinHex or StuffIt file. Despite being an application, they often have a .smi file extension. Disk Copy, the application commonly used to handle disk images in the classic Mac OS was an optional program not part of the standard installation.

Self-mounting images have fallen out of favor with the arrival of Mac OS X. All copies of Mac OS X have DiskImageMounter, the utility for mounting disk images. Support for self-mounting images was removed with the release of OS X Lion in 2011 along with other legacy format archives such as Disk Copy 4.2 (.dc42), and Disk Archive/Retrieval Tool image files (.dart).
