= ArtiosCAD =

Software program

- Developer: Esko
- Stable release: 18.0 / 20 May 2018; 8 years ago
- Operating system: Windows 7 Professional, Enterprise, Ultimate; Windows 8 Pro, Enterprise; Windows 8.1 Pro, Enterprise; Windows 10 Home, Pro, Enterprise; Windows Server 2012 Standard, Datacenter; Windows Server 2012 R2 Standard, Datacenter
- License: proprietary
- Website: www.esko.com/en/products/overview/artioscad/overview/

ArtiosCAD is a computer-aided design software program dedicated to the design of folded packaging, mainly corrugated boxes and folding carton. It has been described as the "global standard" for box designers, box sample makers, die makers. ArtiosCAD is designed in Ludlow, Massachusetts by a subsidiary of Esko, which is headquartered in Gent, Belgium. It is used across schools as a teaching aid for students who will use it in the workforce.

== ArtiosCAD formats ==
ArtiosCAD uses .ARD files as its main native format. An .ARD file typically represents one box. It contains a flat representation of the sheet with its cutlines, crease lines and other production representations. Other native formats:

- .A3D: pre-defined 3D representations of packaging, potentially containing assemblies and other combinations of boxes and their contents in 3D
- .MFG: represents manufacturing information. ARD designs are first stepped/repeated for economical production. This creates a basic representation of the cutting master. This is then further designed to contain helping aids for production such as:
  - Bridges and nicks
  - Rubber
  - Blanking
- .ACD: ArtiosCAD Canvas. A canvas is a 2-dimensional area on which multiple designs are laid out. Said multiple parts typically represent parts of a more complex design. One typical use case is the parts of a carton display with e.g. a foot, a back panel and one or more trays. The .ACD file keeps these parts (which would otherwise have been separate .ARD files) together.

== ArtiosCAD imports ==
ArtiosCAD can import files in many different formats:

- All popular 2D CAD formats, including Solidworks, Designer Workbench, Score!, Vellum...
- Graphics (PDF, EPS, pixel images)
- 3D solids from CATIA, Solidworks, Pro/Engineer...

== ArtiosCAD exports ==
ArtiosCAD can export files in many different formats:

- Cutting table formats
- PDF both 2D and 3D
- PDF with embedded U3D for interactive use.
- All popular 2D CAD formats
- COLLADA for 3D representations with CAD and graphics combined
