= Visual3D Game Engine =

3D video game engine

- Developers: PowerAccess, Realmware Corporation
- Release: 2003
- Stable release: v1.0
- Operating system: Microsoft Windows
- Platform: PC
- Type: Game engine, In-Game Editor (IDE)
- License: Free, Commercial, Open-source
- Website: Visual3D Game Engine

Visual3D Game Engine is a 3D game engine and game development tool written entirely in C# and built for the .NET Framework, with development of its 3D rendering engine beginning in 2003.

Visual3D was founded by PowerAccess for Microsoft Access founder, Dan Moorehead, after its free and open-source software predecessor, RealmForge Game Engine, was featured as the cover story and namesake for Software Developer's Journal July 2015 issue titled 3D Games in .NET, for proving that C#, .NET Framework, and managed languages were feasible for mainstream 3D game and simulation development.

Visual3D (formerly known as Visual3D.NET) is built on the Microsoft XNA, as the first major XNA-based engine and game development tool. However, Visual3D predates XNA and XNA's successor, MonoGame, with it being built upon managed wrappers for Direct3D and OpenGL.

Visual3D is also notable for providing its game development tools as integrated or hosted within whatever game is being developed with it, for live, real-time world building, terrain editing, game development, scripting and mission/level/scenario editing, as well as allowing end-users to redistribute its development tools to End-Users as a Mission/Level/Scenario Editor and Modding Toolkit.

== History ==
Visual3D Game Engine is the commercial successor to the open-source RealmForge Game Engine with roots going back to the OGRE 3D open-source engine. Visual3D is the flagship product of PowerAccess predecessor Realmware Corporation, based in Seattle, Washington.

Visual3D was founded by Dan Moorehead, who, in addition to founding PowerAccess and RealmForge, had also lead development of the Axiom Engine (a C# port of OGRE) and CEGUI# (a C# port of CEGUI GUI library).

Visual3D has 30,000 registered users, and, as of July 2008, Visual3D Game Engine has been employed for multiple private business projects and by the US Department of Defense for military simulation and training. Also in 2008, Visual3D Game Engine has begun to permeate education and Indie sectors as a part of the recent XNA trends.

Visual3D license editions included Indie, Professional, Enterprise, Enterprise Source, as well as Free editions for Open-Source and Educational use.

== Migration of game development to managed languages with C#, Microsoft XNA and MonoGame ==
Following Visual3D predecessor RealmForge Game Engine's success as the first 3D game engine and integrated development toolset for C# and .NET, and it features as the cover story for Software Developer's Journal July 2015 3D Games in .NET issue, Microsoft announced the first public release of its Microsoft XNA Framework and XNA Game Studio products in the August 2006 keynote speech at Microsoft Gamefest conference, confirming the viability of C# and .NET for game development and opening up Xbox 360 and PC for game development by Indies and students with C# and .NET.

This announcement set into motion the rise of many new XNA-based game engines, such as Torque X, a rewrite of GarageGames's popular Torque Game Engine in C# using the XNA Framework.

Microsoft's XNA initiative is a part of the larger trend for gaming technology migrating from traditional C++ to higher level managed languages, such as Java, C#, and VB.NET, which is a continuation of the historic trends for the migration of software development from lower level languages such as Assembly and C to higher level languages such as C++.
