= Fibre Channel Utility =

- Developer(s): Apple Computer
- Operating system: Mac OS X Server
- Type: Fibre Channel manager
- Website: Apple.com/server/macosx/

Fibre Channel Utility is a Mac OS X Server utility for managing Fibre Channels connected to the server. The program will not run without a Fiber Card installed in the server.
