= Quartz Compositor =

Window rendering system used in macOS

- Operating system: macOS
- Type: Display server; Compositing window manager
- License: Proprietary software under EULA
- Website: web.archive.org/web/20150322043623/https://developer.apple.com/technologies/mac/graphics-and-animation.html

Quartz Compositor is the display server and the compositing window manager in macOS. It is responsible for presenting and maintaining rasterized, rendered graphics from the rest of the Core Graphics framework and other renderers in the Quartz technologies family.

== Overview ==
The bitmap output from Quartz 2D, OpenGL, Core Image, QuickTime, or other process is written to a specific memory location, or backing store. The Compositor then reads the data from the backing stores and assembles each into one image for the display, writing that image to the frame buffer memory of the graphics card. Quartz Compositor only accepts raster data, and is the only process that can directly access the graphics frame buffer.

In managing individual windows, Quartz Compositor accepts a bitmap image of the window's contents from its renderer, along with its position. The choice of the renderer is up to the individual application, although most use Quartz 2D. Quartz Compositor then acts as a "visual mixing board," by adding the given window to the whole scene for the display.

In its role as window manager, Quartz Compositor also has an event queue which receives events, such as key strokes and mouse clicks. The Quartz Compositor takes the events from the queue, determines which process owns the window where the event occurred, and passes the event on to the process.

== Quartz Extreme ==
Mac OS X v10.2 introduced graphical acceleration for the Quartz Compositor, which requires far fewer processor cycles for scene composition. The Quartz Compositor encapsulates each rendered backing store in an OpenGL texture map or surface, which is then directed to the GPU to compose the surfaces and maps into a final image, subsequently delivered to the frame buffer.

Quartz Extreme only uses OpenGL commands, and requires a graphics card connected to an AGP 2X or faster bus (including AGP 4X, 8X, and PCI Express), supporting textures and maps of arbitrary size, since many of the renderers have no size limitation (Quartz 2D for example). In Mac OS X Tiger, it is automatically enabled on Mac systems with one of the following types of graphics cards:

- AMD (ATI) Radeon, AGP-based, 16 MB VRAM minimum, or better
- NVIDIA GeForce2 MX, 16 MB VRAM minimum, or better

As of OS X El Capitan, Quartz Extreme is enabled on all supported Macs.

== QuartzGL ==
QuartzGL (called Quartz 2D Extreme when it was introduced in Mac OS X Tiger) is GPU acceleration for the Quartz 2D API. With QuartzGL enabled, all Quartz drawing commands are translated to OpenGL commands and executed on the GPU. This differs from Quartz Extreme, which still executes Quartz drawing commands on the CPU but performs final composition using the GPU.

In OS X Mountain Lion, QuartzGL was still not enabled by default. However, it was possible to enable it using the Quartz Debug application included in the Apple Developer Tools. QuartzGL would be disabled once again upon quitting the Quartz Debug utility. A workaround was to force quit the Quartz Debug application, which would leave QuartzGL enabled system-wide.

All graphics cards capable of supporting Core Image also support QuartzGL.

== See also ==
- Quartz
- Compositing window manager
- X11
- Wayland
- DXGI
- Desktop Window Manager
