= Gateway Setup Assistant =

Gateway Setup Assistant is a tool in Apple Computer's Mac OS X Server versions 10.4 and higher that guides users through setting up Mac OS X Server as an internet gateway.

The Gateway Setup Assistant assumes two network interfaces and will automatically configure the DHCP, NAT, firewall, DNS, and VPN services.
