= GLGE (programming library) =

GLGE is a programming library for use with WebGL and JavaScript.

GLGE is a JavaScript library intended to ease the use of WebGL, a native browser JavaScript API giving direct access to OpenGL ES 2, allowing for the use of hardware accelerated 2D and 3D applications without having to download any plugins.

The aim of GLGE is to mask the involved nature of WebGL from the web developer, who can then spend their time creating richer content for the web.

== Main features ==
- Keyframe animation
- Per-pixel lighting directional lights, spot lights and point lights
- Normal mapping
- Animated materials
- Skeletal animation
- COLLADA format support
- Parallax mapping
- Text rendering
- Fog
- Depth Shadows
- Shader-based picking
- Environment mapping
- Reflections/Refractions
- Collada Animations
- Portals
- LOD
- Culling
- 2D filters
