= Dashcode =

Development environment for Mac OS Dashboard widgets

- A preview version of Dashcode by Apple Inc.
- Developer: Apple Inc.
- Stable release: 3.0.5 / August 7, 2012
- Operating system: Mac OS X
- Type: Widget development
- Website: Dashcode Add-on Download (Apple Developer ID required)

Dashcode was a software application created by Apple Inc. that was included with Mac OS X Leopard and facilitates the development of widgets for Dashboard. It was first included on new MacBooks shipping around the time of May 24, 2006, as part of the Xcode developer tools.

Dashcode, Version 3.0 (328), was included as part of Apple's Xcode developer tools on the Mac OS X Snow Leopard DVD as an optional install.

The last iteration of Dashcode, Version 3.0.5 for Xcode 4, is still available to developer account holders as an optional install from Downloads for Apple Developers (Apple Developer ID required).

== History ==
=== WWDC ===
Steve Jobs mentioned Dashcode as a new feature to be included in Leopard during his 2006 WWDC keynote speech. Although not installed by default as part of an Xcode installation, the DVDs handed out at the WWDC did contain a version of Dashcode. Although the version number was in fact lower than that of the "MacBook build", the WWDC build of Dashcode contained several additional templates, as well as some interface and functionality improvements. This WWDC build launched on both Mac OS X v10.4 and the WWDC build of Mac OS X 10.5 ("Leopard"), but was unusable on 10.4 (crashes soon after startup).

=== Public beta ===
On December 20, 2006, Apple released a public beta of Dashcode. When announcing this release, Apple stated the beta had been "scaled back" for compatibility with Mac OS X v10.4. This beta expired on July 15, 2007.

== Dashcode and iOS ==
Dashcode Version 2.0 (151) is included as part of Apple's iOS SDK. This allows for the creation of Web apps for the iOS version of Safari.

Dashcode Version 3.0.2 (336) is installed with Xcode on OS X Lion. It is not known if this will allow for the local installation of Dashcode-created web apps, as such an ability will allow iOS to run a software layer akin to Mac OS X's Dashboard, which runs on a local installation. Currently, iOS maintains a separation between native code and web code, in that way native applications can access data from the Internet, web content can't be accessed by native applications save for Safari; likewise, web content (including web apps) can be run inside the Safari browser, but cannot have access to the filesystem or other internals of iOS and cannot be installed on the operating system in the same way as native code.

Native code software for iOS is currently developed using the Xcode suite, particularly an iPhone-centric version of Interface Builder packaged with the iOS SDK.
