= ISync =

Software application by Apple

iSync

- iSync 3 screenshot
- Developer: Apple Inc.
- Final release: 3.1.2 (586.1) / November 10, 2010; 15 years ago
- Operating system: Mac OS X
- Type: Personal information manager
- Website: Product page at the Wayback Machine (archived 2009-04-21)

iSync is a defunct application developed by Apple Inc., which syncs iCal and Address Book data to SyncML-enabled mobile phones, via Bluetooth or by using a USB connection. It was first released on Jan 2, 2003, with technology licensed from fusionOne. Support for many (pre-October 2007) devices was built-in, with newer devices being supported via manufacturer and third-party iSync Plugins.

== History ==
iSync's first beta was released on September 28, 2002.

In June 2003, The Register reported that an iSync 1.1 bug could lead to contacts without phone numbers being deleted from synced phones. iSync uses port 3004, which could also be blocked if the Mac OS X firewall was enabled.

Before the release of Mac OS X 10.4, iSync also synchronized a user's Safari bookmarks with the now-defunct .Mac subscription service provided by Apple.

Starting with Mac OS X 10.4, much of iSync's original syncing functionality was moved into the Sync Services framework, which developers can use to incorporate synchronization into their own applications. iSync, however, retained responsibility for the setup, configuration and synchronising of supported mobile handsets. Since the release of iTunes 4.8, the user interface for synchronizing iPods had been delegated to iTunes, although conflict-resolution and substantial changes to contact information (>5%) show an iSync panel. Synchronization with MobileMe (previously .Mac) was then the domain of MobileMe Sync, accessible through a System Preferences pane.

iSync was removed from Mac OS X in version 10.7 (Lion). However, since the underlying framework still existed in Lion and 10.8 (Mountain Lion), it was possible to restore the functionality of iSync using a 10.6 (Snow Leopard) installation or backup.

== Device compatibility ==
In 2005, iSync supported iPods, personal digital assistants (PDAs), mobile phones, and other devices; iSync supported phones from Motorola, Nokia, Panasonic, Sony Ericsson, Siemens, and Sendo.

Before the release of iSync, Palm had released its own sync software, Palm Desktop for Mac, which it soon abandoned. Apple created its own software tool, called Palm Conduit, to make iSync compatible with Palm's HotSync protocol. iSync 2.0 directly integrated Palm Conduit. After the 2009 Palm Pre abandoned HotSync, Apple dropped Palm support from iSync 3.1 in Mac OS X Snow Leopard.

BlackBerry OS, Palm OS, and Windows Mobile (Pocket PC) devices were not officially supported by iSync, but could still be synchronized through the use of third-party iSync plug-ins.

== Version history ==
| iSync version | Operating system version | | | | | Release date | Features |
| | 10.2 | 10.3 | 10.4 | 10.5 | 10.6 | | |
|---|---|---|---|---|---|---|---|
| 3.1.2 | | | | | Yes | November 10, 2010 | Final version of iSync. |
| 3.1.1 | | | | | Yes | | |
| 3.1 | | | | | Yes | August 28, 2009 | Released as part of Mac OS X v10.6 |
| 3.0.2 | | | | Yes | | May 28, 2008 | Released as part of Mac OS X v10.5.3 |
| 3.0 | | | | Yes | | October 26, 2007 | Released as part of Mac OS X v10.5. |
| 2.4 | | | Yes | | | March 13, 2007 | Released as a part of Mac OS X v10.4.9 update. Added support for additional mobile handsets from Motorola, Nokia and Sony Ericsson and offered initial support for two mobile handsets from Samsung. |
| 2.3 | | | Yes | | | June 27, 2006 | Released as a part of Mac OS X v10.4.7 update. Added support for additional mobile handsets. |
| 2.2 | | | Yes | | | April 3, 2006 | Released as a part of Mac OS X v10.4.6 update. Added support for additional mobile handsets, including many Nokia Series 40 devices. |
| 2.1.1 | | | Yes | | | January 10, 2006 | Released as a part of Mac OS X v10.4.4 update. Added support for additional mobile handsets. |
| 2.1 | | | Yes | | | July 11, 2005 | Added support for more devices. |
| 2.0 | | | Yes | | | April 29, 2005 | Released as part of Mac OS X v10.4. iSync now only syncs data between portable devices. Data synching between computers is handled by the operating system. |
| 1.5 | Yes | Yes | | | | August 10, 2004 | Added support for more devices. |
| 1.4 | Yes | Yes | | | | February 17, 2004 | Added support for more devices including Symbian phones and the iPod mini. |
| 1.3 | Yes | Yes | | | | October 24, 2003 | Released to coincide with Mac OS X v10.3 release. Adding support for more devices. |
| 1.2.1 | Yes | | | | | October 8, 2003 | Added support for more devices and calendar support for Symbian phones. |
| 1.1 | Yes | | | | | June 3, 2003 | Added support for more devices. Added bookmark synching between Macs. |
| 1.0 | Yes | | | | | January 2, 2003 | First non-beta release. |

== See also ==
- SyncML
