= Apple USB Modem =

Data and USB modem by Apple

- Also known as: MA034
- Developer: Apple Inc.
- Type: USB modem
- Released: October 12, 2005
- Introductory price: US$49
- Discontinued: September 2009
- Website: support.apple.com/kb/HT3152

The Apple USB Modem is a combined 56 kbit/s data modem and 14.4 kbit/s fax external USB modem introduced by Apple Inc. after the internal 56k modem was dropped on the October 12, 2005 iMac G5 revision. While it looks similar, it should not be confused with Apple's optional USB Ethernet Adapter accessory, available for its MacBook Air and MacBook Pro Retina range of laptops since 2008.

== History ==
Apple introduced its first true modems in 1984, the Apple Modem 300 & 1200 modems (ITU-T V.21 and V.22). Prior to that they offered a third party Apple-badged comparatively low-tech acoustic coupler. Those were followed by the industry standard 2400/data and combined 9600/fax (ITU-T V.29) AppleFax Modem in 1987. Apple introduced the internal 2400 data/fax modem card for its Macintosh Portable in 1989 as well as released its last external desktop Apple Data Modem 2400. Only standard internal modems were offered during the 1990s through 2005, with the notable exception of Apple's foray into GeoPort passive telephony modems which relied heavily upon the computer's software and processing power rather than dedicated hardware (like Apple's proprietary internal Express Modem). The Apple USB Modem is Apple's first true external modem since the Apple Data Modem 2400 was discontinued in 1992.

As of September 2009 it is no longer available in the US Apple Store, but it still works (at least for fax) as of Mac OS X version 10.6.2. No officially supported 64-bit driver exists, and as Mac OS X Lion operates by default in 64-bit mode, the USB modem will not function in Lion without workarounds.

== Features ==
The Apple USB Modem supports V.92, Caller ID, wake-on-ring, telephone answering (V.253), and modem on hold. The modem is manufactured by Motorola. A device driver for the modem was introduced with Mac OS X version 10.4.3.

It retailed for US$49 at the time of its introduction.

Apart from using the Apple USB Modem for Internet dial-up and faxing, it is also being suggested as a low cost line interface (aka FXO interface) for telephony applications, such as for telephone systems (software PBX) and answering machine software.

The highly miniaturized product, about the size of a cigarette lighter and with a 4.6-inch long USB cable, won a RED DOT design award for good design.

== Windows support ==
In Windows, the modem identifies itself as "Motorola SM56 USB Data Fax Modem" and a driver was provided via Boot Camp Assistant.
