= Mission Control (macOS) =

Feature of the macOS operating system

- Mission Control on macOS Sequoia
- Operating system: Mac OS X 10.7 Lion or later and iPadOS 13 or later
- Website: support.apple.com/en-us/HT204100

Mission Control is a feature of the macOS operating system. Dashboard, Exposé, and Spaces were combined and renamed Mission Control in 2011 with the release of Mac OS X 10.7 Lion. Exposé was first previewed on June 23, 2003, at the Apple Worldwide Developers Conference as a feature of the then forthcoming Mac OS X 10.3 Panther.

Mission Control allows a user to do the following:

- View all open application windows
- View all open application windows of a specific application
- Hide all application windows and show the desktop
- Manage application windows across multiple monitors
- Manage application windows across multiple virtual desktops

== Usage ==
Exposé and Mission Control include three separate features for organizing windows and open applications:

All windows
Shows all open and unhidden windows, and all virtual desktops, shrinking their appearance so they all fit on a single screen. On newer Mac keyboards, this is activated from the F3 key, or F9 on older keyboards. On Apple's Magic Mouse or multi-touch trackpads, this can be activated by pulling up on the trackpad with three or four fingers. Mission Control redesigned this feature extensively to show all running desktops.
Application windows
Also called 'App Exposé'. Shows all open and minimized windows for the currently active application. During this mode, the user can choose a window to switch to by using mouse or keyboard, or cycle through windows of different applications by pressing the tab key. This can be activated by pulling down with three or four fingers on a trackpad, the F10 key on older keyboards, by pressing Control + F3 on newer Apple aluminium and MacBook keyboards, or by right-clicking the app's icon on the dock and selecting 'Show all windows'. On OS X Snow Leopard, App Exposé can be activated by clicking and holding the application's icon in the dock.
Desktop
Moves all windows off the screen, with just the edges of the windows visible at the side of the screen, giving the user clear access to the desktop and any icons on it. This can be activated by pressing Command F3 on newer Apple aluminum and Macbook keyboards, the F11 key on older keyboards. On a trackpad, it can be selected by placing four fingers on the trackpad and pulling them away from each other.

In the first two cases, after Mission Control is activated, the user can select any window by clicking on it or selecting it with arrow keys and pressing Enter. Exposé then deactivates, leaving the selected window in the foreground. Using Apple Mighty Mouse, it is possible to select a window using the Scroll Ball, by scrolling in the direction of that window.

The keyboard shortcuts used for activating Exposé can be customized to be any of the function keys, the shift, control, option or command key, the fn key on Mac laptops, or even a mouse button on multiple-button mice (including Apple Mighty Mouse).

Different features of Mission Control can also be activated by moving the mouse to a 'hot corner' of the desktop. This system is off by default; it can be enabled from System Settings.

== Changes in Mission Control ==
When Exposé first premiered in 2003, it could be controlled using the F9, F10 and F11 keys.

The Exposé shortcut keys were moved to the F3 key to make room for the "rewind", "play/pause" and "fast forward" keys. On Mac keyboards made after 2004, Exposé can be activated by using the F3 key or in combination with the command key, or on the trackpad of Macbooks supporting multi-touch interface. (However, F9, F10 and F11 can still be used for controlling Exposé with the function modifier key, or by enabling the "Use all F1, F2, etc. keys as standard function keys" setting.)

On Mac OS X 10.6 Snow Leopard, Exposé featured a new organized grid view and allowed users to activate Exposé from the Dock.

In Mac OS X 10.7 Lion, some features of Dashboard, Exposé, and Spaces were incorporated into Mission Control. This gave an overview of all running applications just like "All windows" but grouped windows from the same application, and added a display of Spaces. Desktop view and application window view were retained, the latter under the name of App Exposé, and could be accessed through gestures on multi-touch trackpads.

Some users criticised Mission Control in Mac OS X 10.7 Lion for not offering an unobscured "Exposé" view of all the windows in single workspace: windows of the same application are always hidden in bundles. This issue was fixed in Mac OS X 10.8 Mountain Lion, however, with a checkbox in the System Settings pane allowing a user to choose whether to group windows of the same application. Some features of Exposé and Spaces from OS X 10.6 Snow Leopard did not return, however: it does not show the names of the windows displayed, nor does it return the added functionality provided by Mac OS X 10.5 Leopard multiple desktops feature, known as "Spaces", which allowed users to drag and drop windows between desktops with a single click, and also allowed for larger thumbnail previews of each desktop in a 2D grid when in use.

In OS X Mavericks, the linen-texture background in Mission Control has been changed into a dark-grey background, as a part of moving away from skeuomorphism.

In OS X Yosemite, the dark-grey background has been replaced with a translucent background, lightly showing the desktop's background and the desktop no longer zooms out.

In OS X El Capitan, the grouped window by app view has been changed into ungrouped windows view by default and the translucent background has been changed to it being transparent that fully shows the desktop's background.

In macOS Catalina, Dashboard has been discontinued, therefore removing Dashboard from view permanently (if it was previously activated) in Mission Control.

== Undocumented features ==
The "blob" was a hidden and undocumented interface to Exposé that was discovered by a member of the MacNN forums. When clicked, it enabled the "Application Windows" mode. When Option+click, it enabled the "All Windows" mode.

Another undocumented feature of Exposé was for the show desktop function. It placed all the open windows in a small box on the screen that can be moved to anywhere on the screen. This function had some bugs, such as after exiting the show desktop mode, the foremost window will not have a shadow and the user will not be able to move the window. However, this was easily fixed by using the show all function. It also had another bug that causes an area of screen the width of the minimised preview to become unresponsive to mouse clicks requiring the windowserver to be restarted.

== Mission control evolution ==
Using the Shift key, Mission Control can be activated in slow motion, as can Dashboard and the minimise effect and several other animations. This is the same effect that was demonstrated by Steve Jobs during the unveiling of Exposé during the 2003 Worldwide Developers Conference.

== Similar alternatives on other Operating Systems ==
Similar effects are used on other operating systems.

Microsoft Windows 2.0 first introduced a window switcher in 1990. Using Alt+Tab ↹, users could see a flattened view of all open windows. Every version of Windows since then has also provided this window switching functionality. Vista and Windows 7 provide an additional feature called Windows Flip 3D, which has a broadly similar purpose. Flip 3D allows a user to flip through all open windows with a three-dimensional perspective. A downside to this method is that the front-most window covers a significant portion of the other windows, unlike Exposé. On the other hand, this allows the user to see the contents of the front-most window, while this can be difficult in Exposé, especially if the user has a large number of windows open. Vista's Desktop Window Manager exposes a public API that allows any application to access the same thumbnail representations that Flip3D uses, and so there are a number of third party add-ons that are able to provide Exposé-like functionality in Vista. A very few third-party applications, such as the Emcee Desktop Organizer, provide Mission Control-like organization of similar windows into visual "stacks", or support Windows 8's "Immersive" Apps. Windows 10 adds a very similar feature called Task View which also includes multiple-desktop support.

Microsoft's Intellipoint Software for Microsoft Mice has a feature similar to Exposé as it also works with live images of windows, rather than static representations.

Microsoft's Windows 7 introduced a feature called "peeking" that allowed a user to hover their mouse over an icon in the taskbar to reveal a small thumbnail depicting the contents of the application's window or windows.

Compiz and KWin are compositing window managers for systems using the X Window System. Both include plugins similar to Exposé - the scale plugin in Compiz and the present windows effect in KWin. Skippy also performs similar functions to Exposé.

Starting with version 3.0, the GNOME desktop environment has gained a new mode called "Overview", which is used to launch applications and manage workspaces. In this mode, windows are scaled and arranged in an Exposé-like fashion for quick switching.

For Classic or Legacy Macintosh systems, the free Finder Workspaces offers functionality similar to Spaces. ChromeOS has a window overview mode that shows a thumbnail of all open windows, available by pressing the 'window switcher' key or swiping up with 3 fingers on the trackpad. Windows in overview mode can be closed by clicking an associated close button, or selected by clicking on the window thumbnail, which also closes overview mode and brings the selected window to the foreground.

== See also ==
- Dashboard (macOS)
- Taskbar
- Zooming user interface
