= Dashboard (macOS) =

Discontinued feature of macOS

- Dashboard widgets running under OS X 10.11 El Capitan
- Stable release: 1.8 (July 20, 2011; 14 years ago) [±]
- Operating system: Mac OS X 10.4 Tiger to macOS 10.14 Mojave
- Type: Widget engine
- Website: www.apple.com/downloads/dashboard/

Dashboard is a discontinued feature of Apple Inc.'s macOS operating systems, used as a secondary desktop for hosting mini-applications known as widgets. These are intended to be simple applications that do not take time to launch. Dashboard applications supplied with macOS included a stock ticker, weather report, calculator, and notepad; while users could create or download their own.

Before Mac OS X 10.7 Lion, when Dashboard is activated, the user's desktop is dimmed and widgets appear in the foreground. Like application windows, they can be moved around, rearranged, deleted, and recreated (so that more than one of the same Widget is open at the same time, possibly with different settings). New widgets can be opened, via an icon bar on the bottom of the layer, loading a list of available apps similar to the iOS home screen or the macOS Launchpad. After loading, the widget is ready for use.

Dashboard was first introduced in Mac OS X 10.4 Tiger. It can be activated as an application, from the Dock, Launchpad, or Spotlight. It can also be accessed by a dashboard key. Alternatively, the user can choose to make Dashboard open on moving the cursor into a preassigned hot corner or keyboard shortcut. Starting with Mac OS X 10.7 Lion, the Dashboard can be configured as a space, accessed by swiping four fingers to the right from the Desktops either side of it.

From OS X 10.10 Yosemite onward, the Dashboard was disabled by default, with the Notification Center becoming the primary method of displaying widgets. Dashboard was removed in macOS 10.15 Catalina. Widget support outside the Notification Center was reintroduced in macOS Sonoma, released in 2023.

== Widget functions and capabilities ==
Dashboard widgets, like web pages, are capable of many different things, including of performing tasks that would be complicated for the user to access manually. One example is the Google Search widget, which simply opens up the user's web browser and performs a Google search. Other widgets, like Wikipedia, grab the contents of web pages and display them within Dashboard. Some widgets can also serve as games, using Adobe Flash (or another multimedia authoring program) to create games just as if they were in a web browser. It is also possible for Mac users to create their own widgets using built-in software.

== Graphics ==
Dashboard uses a variety of graphical effects for displaying, opening, and using widgets. For instance, a 3-D flip effect is used to simulate the widget flipping around; by clicking on a small i icon in the right bottom corner, the user can change the preferences on the reverse side; other effects include crossfading and scaling from icon to body (when opening widgets), a "spin-cycle effect" when a widget is focused and the user presses Command-R or a suck-in effect when they are closed. On sufficiently powered Macs, widgets will produce a ripple effect when they are opened, like a leaf falling onto water. These effects consume considerable processing power but with the help of macOS’s Quartz Extreme and Core Image graphics architectures, sufficient computing power to render them in real time is available. As with Exposé, Front Row and the minimize effect, holding shift down while calling the Dashboard or opening the Dashboard menu bar will display the effect in slow motion.

== Creation of widgets ==
Dashboard widgets are created using Hypertext Markup Language (HTML), Cascading Style Sheets (CSS), and JavaScript. Because the same languages are used for creating websites, many web developers can already build them. Widgets themselves are, at the core, simply HTML files that are displayed within the Dashboard layer; they use the WebKit application framework that is also used in Apple's Safari web browser, meaning even users running earlier versions of macOS — where Dashboard is unavailable — can build them. There is widget API allows the widgets to use Mac-specific interface elements such as the Apple Slider.

When a Dashboard widget is built, it usually consists of six files:

- The widget's HTML file, which is the actual file that will be displayed in the Dashboard layer
- The widget's CSS file, which is used for styling the widget (but is called on from the HTML file)
- The widget's JavaScript file, although it may be implemented directly within the HTML file if the developer desires
- The widget's Property List (called “Info.plist”), which is what Dashboard uses to load the widget’s properties (i.e.: name, version, HTML file, etc.)
- The background image of the widget, in PNG format
- The icon that is displayed in the menu bar

Once all of these files are in the root of a directory, it is given a name and the extension ".wdgt", and then it can be opened up in Dashboard as a widget. More complex widgets may also include a Cocoa widget plugin (for platform-specific functionality), one or more JavaScript files (for text scrolling, preferences, etc.) or multiple images (for personalized select menus or buttons).

Mac OS X 10.5 Leopard includes an application called Dashcode, which is a more user-friendly way of creating widgets. Another new feature of Leopard is called "Web Clip" which lets users easily create widgets from parts of a webpage. For example, during the WWDC 2007 keynote, Steve Jobs made widgets out of the following: the featured news headlines on Yahoo.com, the top ten most searched terms on Google, the Photo of the Day on National Geographic, the Dilbert comic strip, and the box office information from Rotten Tomatoes. The user can also customize the border to further personalize the widgets.

== Comparison with Konfabulator ==
Many people have made comparisons between Konfabulator and Apple's Dashboard, especially after Apple announced the feature while Mac OS X 10.4 Tiger was in development. It was a subject of debate in the online community following the few months before Tiger's official release.

One school of thought came to the conclusion that Dashboard was a "rip-off" of Konfabulator. It points out the visual and functional similarities between Dashboard has been widely compared to Konfabulator (later Yahoo! Widget Engine) and sometimes called a copy of it, due to the similarities between their graphical aspects and the fact that they both use the term “widgets” to describe the objects in their environments. Konfabulator may, in turn, have been based on Apple’s Desk Accessories, first released in 1984 with the original Macintosh. Desk Accessories, similar to widgets, were small mini-applications that operated on a user’s desktop. After the introduction of System 7 and cooperative multitasking, the necessity of creating Desk Accessories was removed and developers were encouraged to create applications instead. The OS continued to support them, for backward compatibility, until the switch to Mac OS X (In fact, the Calculator desk accessory remained in the Mac OS through version 9, seventeen years without a significant update).

The codebases for Konfabulator and Dashboard are also different: Konfabulator uses XML and JavaScript to generate Widgets, whereas Dashboard uses HTML, CSS, JavaScript, and Objective-C.

== Included widgets ==
In the first version of Dashboard released with Mac OS X 10.4 Tiger update 10.4.3. Apple included 14 widgets. They consisted of:

- Address Book (now known as Contacts)
- Business
- Calculator
- Calendar
- Dictionary
- Flight Tracker
- iTunes Controller—no longer included in latest macOS releases.
- Phone Book—no longer included in latest macOS releases.
- Stickies
- Stocks
- Tile Game
- Translation
- Unit Converter
- Weather
- World Clock

After the Macworld 2006 keynote, Steve Jobs also announced four new widgets (Ski Report, People Finder, Google Search, and ESPN), as well as significant updates to the Phone Book and Calendar widgets. All of these are available through the Mac OS X 10.4.4 Tiger update.

In addition, Mac OS X 10.5 Leopard, released in late 2007, includes new widgets. One of these is Web Clip, which allows any user to turn a rectangular section of any webpage into a widget (This, however, only works with the Safari web browser). The widget updates as the website does, and all links and other interactive material in the widget's selection of the webpage works as if the website is being accessed from Safari. Another new widget is Movies, which allows users to find currently playing movies at local theaters, view trailers, and purchase tickets directly from Dashboard. In Mac OS X 10.7 Lion the Phone Book and iTunes Controller widgets were removed

== Widgets on iOS ==
Apple has never announced support for the installation of Dashboard widgets on iOS. Even though, in June 2008, an unannounced update of Dashcode that was packaged with the iPhone SDK allowed for the creation of iPhone-oriented web widgets, it is unknown if this version of Dashcode would support the creation of AJAX-driven mobile widgets that could be installed natively on iOS.

It has been demonstrated that installing Dashboard widgets on a jailbroken iOS device is possible in theory, but most desktop-oriented widgets are not oriented to usage or interaction on iOS's multi-touch screen-oriented interface; they may also rely on DashboardClient's widget JavaScript object, which is not part of iOS.

On June 2, 2014, as part of their announcement of iOS 8, Apple announced that in the "Today" view (which is accessible by swiping down from the status bar) will be able to have downloadable widgets from the App Store. While not the same desktop-oriented widgets that are found in Dashboard, this represented the first time that widgets became available officially (i.e., without jailbreaking) on iOS.

There is an unrelated CarPlay feature with the same name introduced with iOS 13.

On June 22, 2020, during the WWDC Keynote Address, Apple introduced widgets for iOS 14. These widgets can be placed on the homescreen, and can be resized. Users can stack up to 10 widgets, or choose a "Smart Stack" widget which will change depending the user's activity. The iOS widget style also appears in the Notification Center on macOS 11 Big Sur, announced on the same day. With the release of macOS Sonoma, widgets could now be placed on the desktop, replicating some of the functionality of Dashboard.

== See also ==
- Add-on (Mozilla)
- Dashboard (business)
- Google Chrome Extensions
