= Skippy-xd =

Window management tool for X11

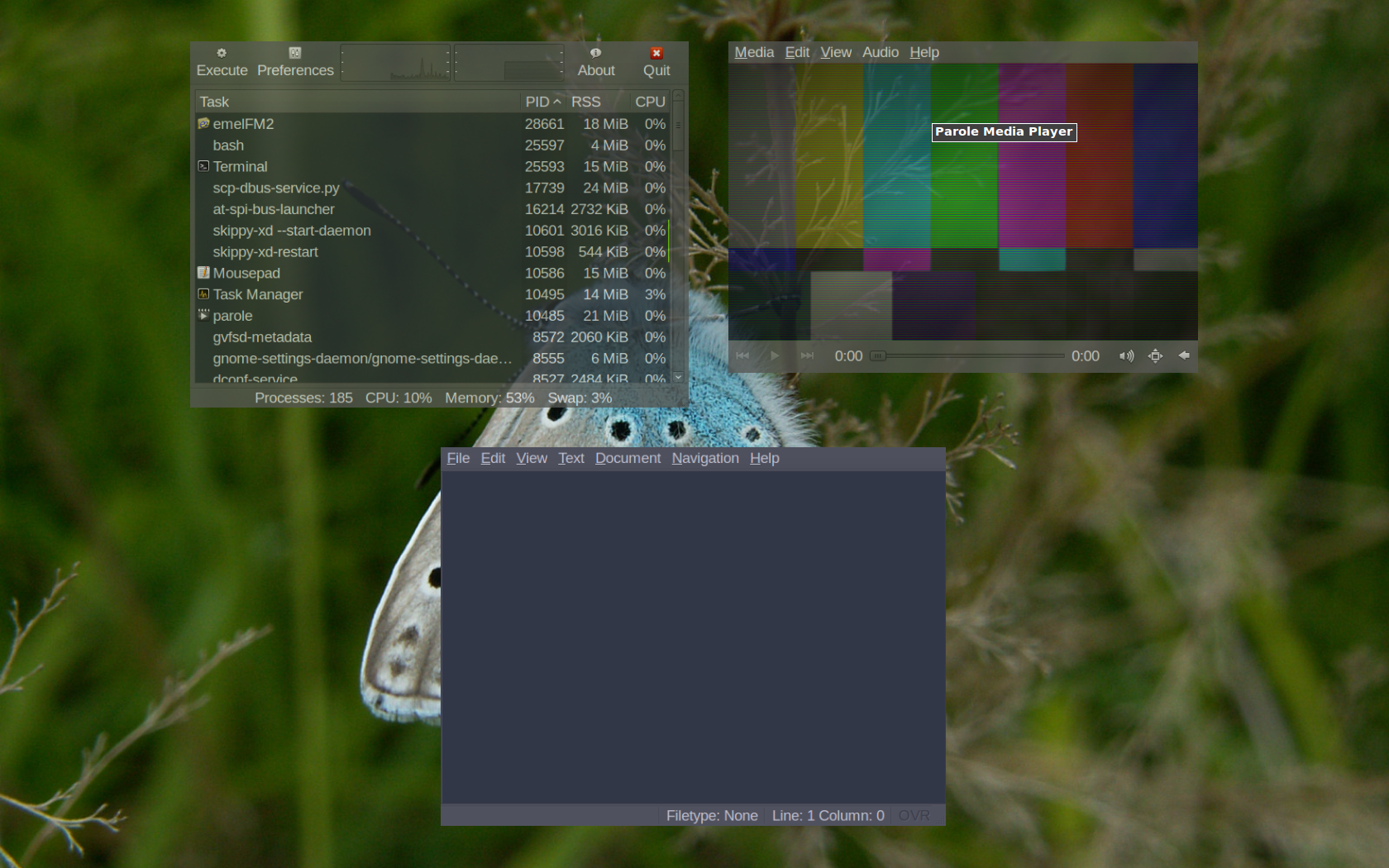
- Skippy-xd under Xfce 4.10
- Developer: Felix Fung
- Stable release: 0.10.7 / May 24, 2026; 5 months ago
- Written in: Programming language: C Build system: Make Dependencies: X11, Xlib, Xcomposite, Xrender, Xdamage, Xfixes, Xinerama
- Operating system: Linux and other Unix-like operating systems
- Type: Fullscreen task switcher
- License: GPL
- Website: Skippy-xd on GitHub

Skippy-xd is a lightweight, customizable, window-manager-agnostic composite window selector for X11. It provides live-preview alt-tab window switching, a fullscreen Exposé-style window overview, and a paging mode for an overview of all virtual desktops. Additional features include animation and live preview of minimized windows. Skippy-xd works with any X11-based window manager.

== Usage ==
Skippy-xd runs as a daemon and is invoked via command-line arguments. After starting the daemon with skippy-xd --start-daemon, it can be activated in different modes:

- skippy-xd --switch --next — alt-tab style window switching with live preview
- skippy-xd --expose — fullscreen Exposé-style overview of all windows
- skippy-xd --paging — overview of all virtual desktops at once

Users typically bind these commands to keyboard shortcuts using a tool such as xbindkeys or their window manager's keybind configuration.

== Clones ==
Projects with similar features include Komposé (an Exposé clone for KDE3, now abandoned) and Compiz, the latter containing built-in Exposé-style functionality activated by pressing F12. Modern KDE Plasma includes similar functionality natively via KWin.

== See also ==
- Dashboard (Mac OS)
- Taskbar
- Konfabulator
- Zooming User Interface
