= Spaces (software) =

Virtual desktop feature of Mac OS X

- A screenshot of Spaces on Mac OS X 10.5 Leopard
- Developer: Apple Inc.
- Final release: 1.1 / August 28, 2009
- Operating system: Mac OS X
- Type: Virtual desktop
- License: Proprietary
- Website: support.apple.com/guide/mac-help/work-in-multiple-spaces-mh14112/mac

Spaces was a virtual desktop feature of Mac OS X, introduced in Mac OS X 10.5 Leopard. It was announced by Steve Jobs during the opening keynote at the Worldwide Developers Conference on August 7, 2006. As of Mac OS X 10.7 Lion, it has been incorporated into Mission Control.

== Overview ==
Spaces enables users to create multiple virtual desktops suited to the unique needs or work habits of the user. A user could, for example, create and assign a "space" to office work, enabling the user to leave a work-related application (such as a word processor or a spreadsheet) running full screen and then switch to a different space designated for browsing the Internet or navigating file structure in Finder windows. Up to 16 spaces can be created, and applications can be bound to specific spaces. There are various ways to navigate between spaces, including user-configured, function-key combinations, hot corners (via Exposé), or by dragging windows and applications — in the direction of the desired space — to the corresponding edge of the screen and holding for a moment until the space switches. The Dashboard functions as a separate space, on the left of the other spaces by default.

== Use ==
In Mac OS X 10.5 Leopard System Preferences, a checkbox labeled "Enable Spaces" must first be checked in the "Exposé & Spaces" preferences, under the "Spaces" tab. Then, as many as 16 spaces can be created by adding rows or columns. Application assignments may be added and bound to specific spaces listed, by their corresponding numbers, in the right-hand column. When an assigned application is launched, it will open on the designated space and remain in that location unless it is moved manually to another space.

There are a few settings for activating and switching between spaces. A checkbox at the bottom of the panel allows switching spaces automatically when switching between applications bound to spaces. This is achieved either by clicking on application icons in the dock, or by pressing ⌘ (Command) + Tab, and Spaces will jump directly to the space that the chosen application has been assigned to. A limitation of Spaces lies in the fact that some applications featuring tool palettes and/or multiple open document windows (such as Adobe Creative Suite or Microsoft Office applications) cannot be consistently bound to a specific (numbered) space. In such cases, the "switching" function responds to the most recently active document, regardless of which space it has been opened upon, so it is usually more efficient to avoid assigning such applications to a specific space and to run them unassigned, opening documents in the desired space.

Function-key combinations can also be configured to activate the full-screen Spaces grid view, switch between spaces directionally, or switch directly to a specific space by number. A function allows applications or windows to be moved into (or through) adjacent spaces by dragging and holding the window (or document) at the edge of the screen. During a transition to a new space, a small, translucent image representing the Spaces grid configuration will be shown in the center of the screen for a few seconds, with arrows representing the movement, and the active space highlighted.

When viewing the full-screen grid, spaces themselves may be re-arranged by dragging and dropping (requires clicking on the blue "desktop" area, instead of on a window within it). This does not change the application assignments, but is equivalent to manually moving a window or document to a new space. The application will retain its assignment and when launched at a later date, will run on the originally assigned space.

Spaces also works effectively with Exposé, another Mac OS X feature, where you can designate a "hot corner" to activate the full-screen feature of Spaces, showing a "zoomed-out" grid of scaled-down thumbnails for each space. Also, when the Spaces grid has been activated, Exposé may be additionally deployed to reveal the active windows or documents on each space.

== Comparison ==
Although Spaces was a new feature for Mac OS X 10.5, virtual desktops existed for quite some time on other platforms, such as Linux, Solaris, AIX and BeOS. Virtual desktops also existed for Windows and for Mac OS X via third party software. The first platform to implement multiple desktop display as a system feature was the Amiga 1000, released in 1985. Virtual Desktops were finally added to the Windows platform with Windows 10 in 2015.
