= Contacts (Apple) =

Address book software by Apple

- Contacts on iOS 17
- Developer: Apple
- Stable release: 13.0
- Operating system: macOS; iOS; iPadOS; watchOS
- Type: Software Address Book
- License: Proprietary
- Website: support.apple.com/en-gb/guide/contacts/welcome/mac

Contacts is a computerized address book software included with the Apple operating systems iOS, iPadOS, watchOS and macOS. It includes various cloud synchronization capabilities and integrates with other Apple applications and features, including iMessage, FaceTime and the iCloud service (and previously its predecessor MobileMe).

== History ==
An application known as Address Book was included with Mac OS X from its release in 2001 and in preceding beta versions. Address Book was rewritten for Mac OS X Jaguar (2002) and as of 2020 has remained in roughly the same form ever since.

The iPhone also included contacts storage from its release, which starting from iPhone OS 2 (2008) was also broken out into a standalone application. In 2010, the iPad with iOS 3.2 introduced a new two-pane contacts app, featuring the skeuomorphic design style popular with Apple around this time under the leadership of Scott Forstall.

OS X Lion (2011) featured a redesigned Address Book application in the style of the iPad Contacts app, also in a two-pane design. In 2012 with OS X Mountain Lion it returned to a three-pane design and changed names to match iOS.

The following year, both versions of Contacts switched with their parent operating systems to a more flat design style, a change attributed to Forstall's departure from Apple in the autumn of 2012. In 2013 iOS Contacts switched to the new UI along with the whole of iOS 7, while with OS X Mavericks the skeuomorphic design was removed leaving a basic UI. With OS X Yosemite (2014) the OS X Contacts app switched along with the rest of the operating system to the iOS 7-style UI.

In 2021, Apple introduced Contacts to Apple Watch in watchOS 8.

== Features ==
- Exports and imports cards in vCard 3.0 format
- Imports cards from LDIF, tab-delimited, and comma-separated files
- C and Objective-C API to interface with other applications
- Prints labels and envelopes, mailing lists, pocket address books
- Can configure page setup and paper size before printing
- One-click automatic look up for duplicate entries
- Change of address notification
- Contact groups
- Smart groups based on Spotlight
- Look up addresses on Apple Maps
- Auto-merge when importing vCards
- Customize fields and categories
- Automatic formatting of phone numbers
- Synchronizes with Microsoft Exchange Server
- Synchronizes with Yahoo! Address Book
- Synchronizes with Google Contact Sync
- Speech recognition searching
- Capability to query an LDAP database containing person information
- Plugin interface allowing third-party developers to add functionality to the program

=== Integration with macOS ===
- Integration with Mail, Calendar, Messages, FaceTime, Fax, Safari, iPhone
- iSync compatibility to sync contacts to phones, PDAs, iPods, and other Macs
- Contacts are indexed by Spotlight
- Address Book stores previous recipient addresses used by Mail
- URLs in Address Book cards appear in Safari's Address Book bookmarks
- Buddies in iChat can be associated with Address Book cards
- Birthdays saved in Address Book appear in iCal if enabled
- Address Book Dashboard Widget
- AppleScript, Automator, and Shortcuts support for querying, adding, modifying, and removing people and groups

== User interface ==
Contacts has two viewing modes: View Card and Column and View Card Only. The user can switch between modes with a control in the upper-left portion of the window under the close box.

In releases prior to Lion, in View Card and Column, the Contacts window is divided into three panes. The first pane has the title Group. This pane lists All, Directories, and each user-made group. Users can add new groups by pulling the File menu down to New Group, or typing Command-Shift-N.

When selecting All or a user-made group, the second column has the title Name. It lists the names of the people with cards in that group, or all the names if the selected group is All, in alphabetical order by first or last name, depending on user preference.

The third pane has the card corresponding to the selected name. The card can include information, some of which the user can classify into customizable categories like Home and Work. Many of the fields can have duplicate entries, for example, if the person the card describes has several email addresses. The user can edit the fields by pressing the edit button below the bottom-left of the third pane. Default fields include:

- Picture
- Name pronunciation
- First name
- Last name
- Job title
- Company
- Phone number
- Email address
- Home page
- Birthday
- Instant messaging username
  - AIM
  - ICQ
  - XMPP
  - Windows Live Messenger
  - Yahoo! Messenger
- Address
- Related Names
- Note

Contacts can search LDAP (network) directories. Users customize these in the LDAP tab of the preferences. Users search these by selecting Directories in the first pane, selecting a directory or All in the second pane, and typing their search in the search box above the top-left of the third pane. Results appear in the third pane.

== See also ==
- Google Contacts
- People (Microsoft service)
