= MacOS =

Operating system for Apple computers

macOS

- macOS Golden Gate
- Developer: Apple
- Written in: C; C++; Objective-C; Swift; assembly language
- OS family: Mac; Darwin; BSD; Unix-like; Unix
- Source model: Proprietary with open source components
- Initial release: March 24, 2001; 25 years ago
- Latest release: 27.2.1 (November 9, 2026; 8 days ago) [±]
- Latest preview
- Available in: 47 languages
- List of languages: Arabic; Catalan; Chinese; Simplified; Traditional; Croatian; Czech; Danish; Dutch; English; Finnish; French; German; Greek; Hebrew; Hindi; Hungarian; Indonesian; Italian; Japanese; Korean; Malay; Norwegian Bokmål; Polish; Portuguese; Romanian; Russian; Spanish; Slovak; Swedish; Thai; Turkish; Ukrainian; Vietnamese
- Supported platforms: Apple silicon (ARM64): ARMv9-A (15.0–present); ARMv8-A (11.0–present); Previously supported: Intel (64-bit); x86-64 (10.4.7–26.7.x); Intel (32-bit); IA-32 (10.4.4–10.6.8); PowerPC; 64-bit ppc970 (10.4–10.5.8); 32-bit ppc7400 (10.0–10.5.8); 32-bit ppc (10.0–10.4.11)
- Kernel type: Hybrid (XNU)
- Default user interface: Aqua (graphical)
- License: Proprietary
- Preceded by: Classic Mac OS, NeXTSTEP
- Official website: apple.com/macos

Support status
- Supported

macOS (previously OS X and originally Mac OS X) is a proprietary Unix operating system, derived from OPENSTEP for Mach and FreeBSD, which has been marketed and developed by Apple since 2001. It is the current operating system for Apple's line of Mac computers. As of April 2026, within the market of desktop and laptop computers, it is the second most widely used desktop OS, after Microsoft Windows and ahead of all Linux distributions, including ChromeOS and SteamOS. As of 2026, the most recent release of macOS is macOS 27 Golden Gate, the 23rd major version of macOS.

Mac OS X succeeded the classic Mac OS, the primary Macintosh operating system from 1984 to 2001. Its underlying architecture came from NeXT's NeXTSTEP, as a result of Apple's acquisition of NeXT, which also brought Steve Jobs back to Apple. The first desktop version, Mac OS X 10.0, was released on March 24, 2001. Apart from OS X Lion, all versions from Mac OS X Leopard onwards are UNIX 03 certified. Each of Apple's other contemporary operating systems, including iOS, iPadOS, watchOS, tvOS, audioOS and visionOS, are derivatives of macOS. During its history, macOS has supported three major processor architectures: the initial version supported PowerPC-based Macs only, with support for Intel-based Macs beginning with Mac OS X Tiger 10.4.4 and support for ARM-based Apple silicon Macs beginning with macOS Big Sur. Support for PowerPC-based Macs was dropped with Mac OS X Snow Leopard, and it was announced at the 2025 Worldwide Developers Conference that macOS Tahoe will be the last to support Intel-based Macs.

Unlike versions of the classic Mac OS, Mac OS X retained the same major version number (10) for almost two decades, with major releases only incrementing the minor version number (e.g. 10.5 → 10.6). Since 2020, Apple increments the major version component in each major release, with macOS Big Sur getting version number 11. In 2025, the numbering scheme was changed once again, now using the number of the year that follows the release year (e.g. macOS Tahoe, released in September 2025, has a version number 26).

A prominent part of macOS's original brand identity was the use of the Roman numeral X, pronounced "ten", as well as code naming each release after species of big cats, and later, places within California. Apple shortened the name to "OS X" in 2011 and then changed it to "macOS" in 2016 to align with the branding of Apple's other operating systems. In 2020, macOS Big Sur was presented as version 11—a marked departure after 16 releases of Mac OS X/macOS 10.x—but the naming convention continued to reference places within California. In 2025, Apple unified the version number across all of its products to align with the year after their WWDC announcement, so the release announced at the 2025 WWDC, macOS Tahoe, is macOS 26.

== History ==
=== Development ===
The heritage of what would become macOS originated at NeXT, a company founded by Steve Jobs following his departure from Apple in 1985. There, the Unix-like NeXTSTEP operating system was developed, before being launched in 1989. The kernel of NeXTSTEP is based upon the Mach kernel, which was originally developed at Carnegie Mellon University, with additional kernel layers and low-level user space code derived from parts of FreeBSD and other BSD operating systems. Its graphical user interface was built on top of an object-oriented GUI toolkit using the Objective-C programming language.

Throughout the 1990s, Apple had tried to create a "next-generation" OS to succeed its classic Mac OS through the Taligent, Copland and Gershwin projects; however, all were eventually abandoned. This led Apple to acquire NeXT in 1997, allowing NeXTSTEP, later called OPENSTEP, to serve as the basis for Apple's next-generation operating system. The acquisition also led to Steve Jobs returning to Apple as interim and later permanent CEO, shepherding the transformation of the programmer-friendly OPENSTEP into a system that would be adopted by Apple's primary market of home users and creative professionals. The project was codenamed "Rhapsody" before being officially named Mac OS X.

=== Mac OS X ===
The "X" in Mac OS X's name represents the Roman numeral for the number ten, and Apple has stated that it should be pronounced "ten" in this context; it is also commonly pronounced like the letter "X". The iPhone X, iPhone XR and iPhone XS all later followed this convention.

The first version of Mac OS X, Mac OS X Server 1.0, was a transitional product, featuring an interface resembling the classic Mac OS, though it was not compatible with software designed for the older system.

The all new interface and operating system for consumers was shown for the first time at the Macworld 2000. Consumer releases of Mac OS X included a completely new interface called Aqua, the new Quartz rendering system, the Dock, Carbon API to maintain more backward compatibility and much more. Mac OS applications could be rewritten to run natively via the Carbon API, with many alternatively able to be run directly through the Classic Environment albeit with a reduction in performance.

The consumer version of Mac OS X was launched in March 2001 with Mac OS X 10.0. Reviews were varied, with many praising its sophisticated, glossy Aqua interface, but criticizing it for sluggish performance. With Apple's popularity at a low, the developer of FrameMaker, Adobe Inc., declined to develop new versions of it for Mac OS X. Ars Technica columnist John Siracusa, who reviewed every major OS X release up to 10.10, described the early releases in retrospect as "dog-slow, feature poor" and Aqua as "unbearably slow and a huge resource hog".

Over the following years, Apple rapidly developed several new releases of Mac OS X. Apple released Mac OS X 10.1 in October 2001, delivering quality of life enhancements. Beginning in January 2002, Apple preinstalled Mac OS X as the default operating system on all Macs. Later that year Apple released Mac OS X Jaguar (version 10.2), the first version to publicly use its code name in marketing and advertisements. When Mac OS X Panther (10.3) released in 2003, Siracusa noted that "It's strange to have gone from years of uncertainty and vaporware to a steady annual supply of major new operating system releases." Mac OS X Tiger (10.4), which released in 2005, reportedly shocked executives at Microsoft by offering a number of features, such as fast file searching and improved graphics processing, that Microsoft had spent several years struggling to add to Windows Vista with acceptable performance.

As the operating system evolved, it moved away from the classic Mac OS, with applications being added and removed. Considering music to be a key market, Apple developed the iPod music player and music software for the Mac, including iTunes and GarageBand. Targeting the consumer and media markets, Apple emphasized its new "digital lifestyle" applications such as the iLife suite, integrated home entertainment through the Front Row media center and the Safari web browser. With the increasing popularity of the internet, Apple offered additional online services, including the .Mac, MobileMe, and later, iCloud products. It later began selling third-party applications through the Mac App Store.

Newer versions of Mac OS X also included modifications to the general interface, moving away from the striped gloss and transparency of the initial versions. Some applications began to use a brushed metal appearance, or non-pinstriped title bar appearance in Mac OS X Tiger. In Mac OS X Leopard (10.5), Apple announced a unification of the interface, with a standardized gray-gradient window style.

In 2006, the first Intel Macs were released with a specialized version of Mac OS X Tiger.

A key development for the system was the announcement and release of the iPhone from 2007 onwards. While Apple's previous iPod media players used a minimal operating system, the iPhone used an operating system based on Mac OS X, which would later be called iPhone OS and then iOS. The simultaneous release of two operating systems based on the same frameworks placed tension on Apple, which cited the iPhone as forcing it to delay Mac OS X Leopard. However, after Apple opened the iPhone to third-party developers, its commercial success drew attention to Mac OS X, with many iPhone software developers showing interest in Mac development.

In 2007, Mac OS X Leopard released with universal binary components, allowing installation on both Intel Macs and select PowerPC Macs. It is also the final release with PowerPC Mac support. In 2009, Mac OS X Snow Leopard (10.6) was the first version of Mac OS X to be built exclusively for Intel Macs and the final release with 32-bit Intel Mac support. The name was intended to signal its status as an iteration of Leopard, focusing on technical and performance improvements rather than user-facing features; indeed it was explicitly branded to developers as being a 'no new features' release. Since its release, several OS X or macOS releases (namely OS X Mountain Lion, OS X El Capitan, macOS High Sierra, and macOS Monterey) follow this pattern, with a name derived from its predecessor, similar to the 'tick–tock model' used by Intel.

Starting in 2011 with Mac OS X Lion (10.7) and OS X Mountain Lion (10.8), Apple moved some applications to a highly skeuomorphic style of design inspired by contemporary versions of iOS while simplifying some elements by making controls such as scroll bars fade out when not in use. This direction was, like brushed metal interfaces, unpopular with some users, although it continued a trend of greater animation and variety in the interface previously seen in design aspects such as the Time Machine backup utility, which presented past file versions against a swirling nebula, and the glossy translucent dock of Leopard and Snow Leopard. In addition, with Lion, Apple ceased to release separate server versions of Mac OS X, selling server tools as a separate downloadable application through the Mac App Store. A review described the trend in the server products as becoming "cheaper and simpler... shifting its focus from large businesses to small ones."

=== OS X ===
OS X logo used until 2013

In 2012, with the release of OS X Mountain Lion, the name of the system was officially shortened from Mac OS X to OS X, after the previous version shortened the system name in a similar fashion a year prior. That year, Apple removed the head of OS X development, Scott Forstall, and design was changed towards a more minimal direction. Apple's new user interface design, using deep color saturation, text-only buttons and a minimal, 'flat' interface, was debuted with iOS 7 in 2013. With OS X engineers reportedly working on iOS 7, the version released in 2013, OS X Mavericks (10.9), was something of a transitional release, with some of the skeuomorphic design removed, while most of the general interface of Mavericks remained unchanged. The next version, OS X Yosemite (10.10), adopted a design similar to iOS 7 but with greater complexity suitable for an interface controlled with a mouse.

From 2012 onwards, the system has shifted to an annual release schedule similar to that of Mac OS X releases prior to 10.4 Tiger. It also steadily cut the cost of updates from Snow Leopard onwards, before removing upgrade fees altogether in OS X Mavericks. Some journalists and third-party software developers have suggested that this decision, while allowing more rapid feature release, meant less opportunity to focus on stability, with no version of OS X recommendable for users requiring stability and performance above new features. Apple's 2015 update, OS X El Capitan (10.11), was announced to focus specifically on stability and performance improvements.

=== macOS ===
Current logo

In 2016, with the release of macOS Sierra (10.12), the name was changed from OS X to macOS with the purpose of aligning it with the branding of Apple's other primary operating systems: iOS, watchOS, and tvOS. macOS Sierra added Siri, iCloud Drive, picture-in-picture support, a Night Shift mode that switches the display to warmer colors at night, and two Continuity features: Universal Clipboard, which syncs a user's clipboard across their Apple devices, and Auto Unlock, which can unlock a user's Mac with their Apple Watch. macOS Sierra also adds support for the Apple File System (APFS), Apple's successor to the dated HFS+ file system. macOS High Sierra (10.13), released in 2017, included performance improvements, Metal 2 and HEVC support, and made APFS the default file system for SSD boot drives.

Its successor, macOS Mojave (10.14), was released in 2018, adding a dark mode option and a dynamic wallpaper setting. It was succeeded by macOS Catalina (10.15) in 2019, which replaces iTunes with separate apps for different types of media, and introduces the Catalyst system for porting iOS apps.

In 2020, Apple announced macOS Big Sur (version 11) at that year's WWDC. This was the first increment in the primary version number of macOS since the release of Mac OS X Public Beta in 2000; updates to macOS Big Sur were given 11.x numbers, matching the version numbering scheme used by Apple's other operating systems. Big Sur brought major changes to the user interface and was the first version to run on Apple Silicon, based on the ARM architecture. The numbering system started with Big Sur continued in 2021 with macOS Monterey (12), 2022 with macOS Ventura (13), 2023 with macOS Sonoma (14), and 2024 with macOS Sequoia (15).

In 2025, starting with macOS Tahoe (version 26), macOS's version number will be based on the year following its release, as will the version numbers of iOS, iPadOS, watchOS, tvOS, and visionOS, making the version numbers the same for all of the Apple operating systems. macOS Tahoe also introduced a new user interface design, called Liquid Glass, which was also used on all of Apple's other platforms, unifying their design language. During its Platforms State of the Union event on June 9, 2025, Apple announced that Tahoe would be the final version of macOS to operate on Intel-based Macs.

In 2026, Apple announced macOS Golden Gate (version 27) at WWDC 2026. It is the first version of macOS to run exclusively on Macs with Apple silicon and the last version with full Rosetta 2 functionality.

=== Timeline of releases ===
Overview of macOS versions
| Release | | Darwin version | Release date | Latest release | | Compatibility | | |
| Version | Name | Darwin version | Release date | Version | Release date | Processor | Application | Kernel |
|---|---|---|---|---|---|---|---|---|
| Mac OS X Server 1.0 | Hera (Note: Internal codename.) | 0.1-0.3 | March 16, 1999 | 1.2v3 | October 27, 2000 | 32-bit PowerPC | 32-bit PowerPC | 32-bit |
| Mac OS X 10.0 | Cheetah | 1.3.1 | March 24, 2001 | 10.0.4 | June 22, 2001 | 32-bit PowerPC | 32-bit PowerPC | 32-bit |
| Mac OS X 10.1 | Puma | 1.4.1/5 | September 25, 2001 | 10.1.5 | June 6, 2002 | 32-bit PowerPC | 32-bit PowerPC | 32-bit |
| Mac OS X 10.2 | Jaguar | 6 | August 24, 2002 | 10.2.8 | October 3, 2003 | 32/64-bit PowerPC (Note: The Power Mac G5 had special Jaguar builds.) | 32-bit PowerPC | 32-bit |
| Mac OS X 10.3 | Panther | 7 | October 24, 2003 | 10.3.9 | April 15, 2005 | 32/64-bit PowerPC | 32-bit PowerPC | 32-bit |
| Mac OS X 10.4 | Tiger | 8 | April 29, 2005 | 10.4.11 | November 14, 2007 | 32/64-bit PowerPC and Intel (Note: Tiger did not support 64-bit GUI applications, only 64-bit CLI applications.) (Note: 32-bit (but not 64-bit) PowerPC applications were supported on Intel processors with Rosetta.) | | 32-bit |
| Mac OS X 10.5 | Leopard | 9 | October 26, 2007 | 10.5.8 | August 13, 2009 | 32/64-bit PowerPC and Intel | | 32-bit |
| Mac OS X 10.6 | Snow Leopard | 10 | August 28, 2009 | 10.6.8 | July 25, 2011 | 32/64-bit Intel | 32/64-bit Intel; 32-bit PowerPC | 32/64-bit |
| Mac OS X 10.7 | Lion | 11 | July 20, 2011 | 10.7.5 | October 4, 2012 | 64-bit Intel | 32/64-bit Intel | 32/64-bit |
| OS X 10.8 | Mountain Lion | 12 | July 25, 2012 | 10.8.5 | August 13, 2015 | 64-bit Intel | 32/64-bit Intel | 64-bit |
| OS X 10.9 | Mavericks | 13 | October 22, 2013 | 10.9.5 | July 18, 2016 | 64-bit Intel | 32/64-bit Intel | 64-bit |
| OS X 10.10 | Yosemite | 14 | October 16, 2014 | 10.10.5 | July 19, 2017 | 64-bit Intel | 32/64-bit Intel | 64-bit |
| OS X 10.11 | El Capitan | 15 | September 30, 2015 | 10.11.6 | July 9, 2018 | 64-bit Intel | 32/64-bit Intel | 64-bit |
| macOS 10.12 | Sierra | 16 | September 20, 2016 | 10.12.6 | September 26, 2019 | 64-bit Intel | 32/64-bit Intel | 64-bit |
| macOS 10.13 | High Sierra | 17 | September 25, 2017 | 10.13.6 | November 12, 2020 | 64-bit Intel | 32/64-bit Intel | 64-bit |
| macOS 10.14 | Mojave | 18 | September 24, 2018 | 10.14.6 | July 21, 2021 | 64-bit Intel | 32/64-bit Intel | 64-bit |
| macOS 10.15 | Catalina | 19 | October 7, 2019 | 10.15.8 | February 2, 2026 | 64-bit Intel | 64-bit Intel | 64-bit |
| macOS 11 | Big Sur | 20 | November 12, 2020 | 11.7.11 | February 2, 2026 | 64-bit Intel and ARM (Note: 64-bit Intel applications are supported on Apple silicon Macs with Rosetta 2. However, Intel-based Macs are unable to run ARM-based applications, such as iOS and iPadOS apps.) | | 64-bit |
| macOS 12 | Monterey | 21 | October 25, 2021 | 12.7.6 | July 29, 2024 | 64-bit Intel and ARM | | 64-bit |
| macOS 13 | Ventura | 22 | October 24, 2022 | 13.7.8 | August 20, 2025 | 64-bit Intel and ARM | | 64-bit |
| macOS 14 | Sonoma | 23 | September 26, 2023 | 14.8.9 | August 6, 2026 | 64-bit Intel and ARM | | 64-bit |
| macOS 15 | Sequoia | 24 | September 16, 2024 | 15.8.3 | November 9, 2026 | 64-bit Intel and ARM | | 64-bit |
| macOS 26 | Tahoe | 25 | September 15, 2025 | 26.7.3 | November 9, 2026 | 64-bit Intel and ARM | | 64-bit |
| macOS 27 | Golden Gate | 27 | September 14, 2026 | 27.2.1 | November 9, 2026 | 64-bit ARM | 64-bit Intel and ARM (Note: 64-bit Intel applications are supported on Apple silicon Macs with Rosetta 2.) | 64-bit |
Legend: Unsupported Supported Latest version Preview version

== Architecture ==
At macOS's core is a POSIX-compliant operating system built on top of the XNU kernel, (which incorporated large parts of FreeBSD kernel) and FreeBSD userland for the standard Unix facilities available from the command line interface. Apple has released this family of software as a free and open source operating system named Darwin. On top of Darwin, Apple layered a number of components, including the Aqua interface and the Finder, to complete the GUI-based operating system which is macOS.

With its original introduction as Mac OS X, the system brought a number of new capabilities to provide a more stable and reliable platform than its predecessor, the classic Mac OS. For example, pre-emptive multitasking and memory protection improved the system's ability to run multiple applications simultaneously without them interrupting or corrupting each other. Many aspects of macOS's architecture are derived from OPENSTEP, which was designed to be portable, to ease the transition from one platform to another. For example, NeXTSTEP was ported from the original 68k-based NeXT workstations to x86 and other architectures before NeXT was purchased by Apple, and OPENSTEP was later ported to the PowerPC architecture as part of the Rhapsody project.

Prior to macOS High Sierra, and on drives other than solid state drives (SSDs), the default file system is HFS+, which it inherited from the classic Mac OS. Operating system designer Linus Torvalds had criticized HFS+, saying it is "probably the worst file system ever", whose design is "actively corrupting user data". He criticized the case insensitivity of file names, a design made worse when Apple extended the file system to support Unicode.

The Darwin subsystem in macOS manages the file system, which includes the Unix permissions layer. In 2003 and 2005, two Macworld editors expressed criticism of the permission scheme; Ted Landau called misconfigured permissions "the most common frustration" in macOS, while Rob Griffiths suggested that some users may even have to reset permissions every day, a process which can take up to 15 minutes. Later, another Macworld editor, Dan Frakes, called the procedure of repairing permissions vastly overused. He argues that macOS typically handles permissions properly without user interference, and resetting permissions should only be tried when problems emerge.

The architecture of macOS incorporates a layered design: the layered frameworks aid rapid development of applications by providing existing code for common tasks. Apple provides its own software development tools, most prominently an integrated development environment called Xcode. Xcode provides interfaces to compilers that support several programming languages including C, C++, Objective-C, and Swift. For the Mac transition to Intel processors, it was modified so that developers could build their applications as a universal binary, which provides compatibility with both the Intel-based and PowerPC-based Macintosh lines. First and third-party applications can be controlled programmatically using the AppleScript framework, retained from the classic Mac OS, or using the newer Automator application that offers pre-written tasks that do not require programming knowledge.

=== Software compatibility ===
Apple offered two main APIs to develop software natively for macOS: Cocoa and Carbon. Cocoa was a descendant of APIs inherited from OPENSTEP with no ancestry from the classic Mac OS, while Carbon was an adaptation of classic Mac OS APIs, allowing Mac software to be minimally rewritten to run natively on Mac OS X.

The Cocoa API was created as the result of a 1993 collaboration between NeXT Computer and Sun Microsystems. This heritage is highly visible for Cocoa developers, since the "NS" prefix is ubiquitous in the framework, standing variously for NeXTSTEP or NeXT/Sun. The official OPENSTEP API, published in September 1994, was the first to split the API between Foundation and ApplicationKit and the first to use the "NS" prefix. Traditionally, Cocoa programs have been mostly written in Objective-C, with Java as an alternative. However, on July 11, 2005, Apple announced that "features added to Cocoa in Mac OS X versions later than 10.4 will not be added to the Cocoa-Java programming interface." macOS also used to support the Java Platform as a "preferred software package"—in practice this means that applications written in Java fit as neatly into the operating system as possible while still being cross-platform compatible, and that graphical user interfaces written in Swing look almost exactly like native Cocoa interfaces. Since 2014, Apple has promoted its new programming language Swift as the preferred language for software development on Apple platforms.

Apple's original plan with macOS was to require all developers to rewrite their software into the Cocoa APIs. This caused much outcry among existing Mac developers, who threatened to abandon the platform rather than invest in a costly rewrite, and the idea was shelved. To permit a smooth transition from Mac OS 9 to Mac OS X, the Carbon Application Programming Interface (API) was created. Applications written with Carbon were initially able to run natively on both classic Mac OS and Mac OS X, although this ability was later dropped as Mac OS X developed. Carbon was not included in the first product sold as Mac OS X: the little-used original release of Mac OS X Server 1.0, which also did not include the Aqua interface. Apple limited further development of Carbon from the release of Leopard onwards and announced that Carbon applications would not run at 64-bit. A number of macOS applications continued to use Carbon for some time afterwards, especially ones with heritage dating back to the classic Mac OS and for which updates would be difficult, uneconomic or not necessary. This included Microsoft Office up to Office 2016, and Photoshop up to CS5. Early versions of macOS could also run some classic Mac OS applications through the Classic Environment with performance limitations; this feature was removed from 10.5 onwards and all Macs using Intel processors.

Because macOS is POSIX compliant, many software packages written for the other Unix-like systems including Linux can be recompiled to run on it, including many scientific and technical programs. Third-party projects such as Homebrew, Fink, MacPorts and pkgsrc provide pre-compiled or pre-formatted packages. Apple and others have provided versions of the X Window System graphical interface which can allow these applications to run with an approximation of the macOS look-and-feel. The current Apple-endorsed method is the open-source XQuartz project; earlier versions could use the X11 application provided by Apple, or before that the XDarwin project.

Applications can be distributed to Macs and installed by the user from any source and by any method such as downloading (with or without code signing, available via an Apple developer account) or through the Mac App Store, a marketplace of software maintained by Apple through a process requiring the company's approval. Apps installed through the Mac App Store run within a sandbox, restricting their ability to exchange information with other applications or modify the core operating system and its features. This has been cited as an advantage, by allowing users to install apps with confidence that they should not be able to damage their system, but also as a disadvantage due to blocking the Mac App Store's use for professional applications that require elevated privileges. Applications without any code signature cannot be run by default except from a computer's administrator account.

Apple produces macOS applications. Some are included with macOS and some sold separately. This includes iWork, Final Cut Pro, Logic Pro, iLife, and the database application FileMaker. Numerous other developers also offer software for macOS.

In 2018, Apple introduced an application layer, codenamed Marzipan, to port iOS apps to macOS. macOS Mojave included ports of four first-party iOS apps including Home and News, and it was announced that the API would be available for third-party developers to use from 2019. With macOS Catalina in 2019, the application layer was made available to third-party developers as Mac Catalyst.

=== Hardware compatibility ===
List of macOS versions, the supported systems on which they run, and their RAM requirements

| Operating system | Release year(s) | Supported systems | RAM requirement |
|---|---|---|---|
| 10.0 – 10.2 (Jaguar) | 2001 – 2002 | G3, G4 and G5 iBook and PowerBook, Power Mac and iMac (except PowerBook G3 "Kanga") | 128 MB |
| 10.3 (Panther) | 2003 | Macs with a New World ROM | 128 MB |
| 10.4 (Tiger) | 2004 | Macs with built-in FireWire and either a New World ROM or Intel processor | 256 MB |
| 10.5 (Leopard) | 2006 | Select G4, G5, and Intel Macs (32-bit or 64-bit) at 867 MHz or faster Classic support dropped from 10.5 and later. | 512 MB |
| 10.6 (Snow Leopard) | 2008 | Intel Macs (32-bit or 64-bit) | 1 GB |
| 10.7 (Lion) | 2010 | Intel Macs (64-bit); Rosetta support dropped from 10.7 and later. | 2 GB |
| 10.8 (Mountain Lion) – 10.11 (El Capitan) | 2012 – 2015 | Laptops: MacBook (Aluminum, Late 2008 or later), MacBook Air (Late 2008 or later), MacBook Pro (Mid 2007 or later); Desktops: Mac Mini (Early 2009 or later), iMac (Mid 2007 or later), Mac Pro (Early 2008 or later); Servers: Xserve (Early 2009) | 2 GB |
| 10.12 (Sierra) – 10.13 (High Sierra) | 2016 – 2017 | Laptops: MacBook (Late 2009 or later), MacBook Air (Late 2010 or later), MacBook Pro (Mid 2010 or later); Desktops: Mac Mini (Mid 2010 or later), iMac (Late 2009 or later), iMac Pro (2017) (macOS 10.13), Mac Pro (Mid 2010 or later) | 2 GB |
| 10.14 (Mojave) | 2018 | Laptops: MacBook (Early 2015 or later), MacBook Air (Mid 2012 or later), MacBook Pro (Mid 2012 or later); Desktops: Mac Mini (Late 2012 or later), iMac (Late 2012 or later), iMac Pro (2017), Mac Pro (Mid 2010 or later) | 2 GB |
| 10.15 (Catalina) | 2019 | Laptops: MacBook (Early 2015 or later), MacBook Air (Mid 2012 or later), MacBook Pro (Mid 2012 or later); Desktops: Mac Mini (Late 2012 or later), iMac (Late 2012 or later), iMac Pro (2017), Mac Pro (Late 2013 or later) | 4 GB |
| 11 (Big Sur) | 2020 | Laptops: MacBook (Early 2015 or later), MacBook Air (Mid 2013 or later), MacBook Pro (Late 2013 or later); Desktops: Mac Mini (Late 2014 or later), iMac (Mid 2014 or later), iMac Pro (2017), Mac Pro (Late 2013 or later) | 4 GB |
| 12 (Monterey) | 2021 | Laptops: MacBook (Early 2016 or later), MacBook Air (Early 2015 or later), MacBook Pro (Early 2015 or later); Desktops: Mac Mini (Late 2014 or later), iMac (Late 2015 or later), iMac Pro (2017), Mac Studio (2022), Mac Pro (Late 2013 or later) | 4 GB |
| 13 (Ventura) | 2022 | Laptops: MacBook (2017), MacBook Air (2018 or later), MacBook Pro (2017 or later); Desktops: Mac Mini (2018 or later), iMac (2017 or later), iMac Pro (2017), Mac Studio (2022 or later), Mac Pro (2019 or later) | 8 GB |
| 14 (Sonoma) | 2023 | Laptops: MacBook Air (2018 or later), MacBook Pro (2018 or later); Desktops: Mac Mini (2018 or later), iMac (2019 or later), iMac Pro (2017), Mac Studio (2022 or later), Mac Pro (2019 or later) | 8 GB |
| 15 (Sequoia) | 2024 | Laptops: MacBook Air (2020 or later), MacBook Pro (2018 or later); Desktops: Mac Mini (2018 or later), iMac (2019 or later), iMac Pro (2017), Mac Studio (2022 or later), Mac Pro (2019 or later) | 8 GB |
| 26 (Tahoe) | 2025 | Laptops: MacBook Neo (2026), MacBook Air (M1 or later), MacBook Pro (16-inch 2019; 13-inch, 4 ports, 2020; or later); Desktops: Mac Mini (M1 or later), iMac (2020 or later), Mac Studio (2022 or later), Mac Pro (2019 or later) | 8 GB |
| 27 (Golden Gate) | 2026 | Laptops: MacBook Neo (2026), MacBook Air (M1 or later), MacBook Pro (M1 or later); Desktops: Mac Mini (M1 or later), iMac (2021 or later), Mac Studio (2022 or later), Mac Pro (2023) | 8 GB |

Tools such as XPostFacto and patches applied to the installation media have been developed by third parties to enable installation of newer versions of macOS on systems not officially supported by Apple. This includes a number of pre-G3 Power Macintosh systems that can be made to run up to and including Mac OS X 10.2 Jaguar, all G3-based Macs which can run up to and including Tiger, and sub-867 MHz G4 Macs can run Leopard by removing the restriction from the installation DVD or entering a command in the Mac's Open Firmware interface to tell the Leopard Installer that it has a clock rate of 867 MHz or greater. Except for features requiring specific hardware such as graphics acceleration or DVD writing, the operating system offers the same functionality on all supported hardware.

As most Mac hardware components, or components similar to those, since the Intel transition are available for purchase, some technology-capable groups have developed software to install macOS on non-Apple computers. These are referred to as Hackintoshes, a portmanteau of the words "hack" and "Macintosh". This violates Apple's EULA (and is therefore unsupported by Apple technical support, warranties etc.), but communities that cater to personal users, who do not install for resale and profit, have generally been ignored by Apple. These self-made computers allow more flexibility and customization of hardware, but at a cost of leaving the user more responsible for their own machine, such as on matter of data integrity or security. Psystar, a business that attempted to profit from selling macOS on non-Apple certified hardware, was sued by Apple in 2008.

=== PowerPC–Intel transition ===
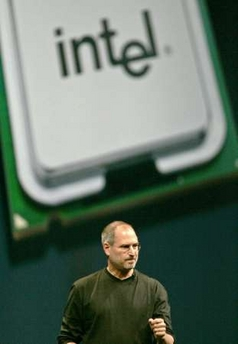
Steve Jobs talks about the transition to Intel processors.

In April 2002, eWeek announced a rumor that Apple had a version of Mac OS X code-named Marklar, which ran on Intel x86 processors. The idea behind Marklar was to keep Mac OS X running on an alternative platform should Apple become dissatisfied with the progress of the PowerPC platform. These rumors subsided until late in May 2005, when various media outlets, such as The Wall Street Journal and CNET, announced that Apple would unveil Marklar in the coming months.

On June 6, 2005, Steve Jobs announced in his keynote address at WWDC that Apple would be making the transition from PowerPC to Intel processors over the following two years, and that Mac OS X would support both platforms during the transition. Jobs also confirmed rumors that Apple had versions of Mac OS X running on Intel processors for most of its developmental life. Intel-based Macs would run a new recompiled version of OS X along with Rosetta, a binary translation layer which enables software compiled for PowerPC Mac OS X to run on Intel Mac OS X machines. The system was included with Mac OS X versions up to version 10.6.8. Apple dropped support for Classic mode on the new Intel Macs. Third party emulation software such as Mini vMac, Basilisk II and SheepShaver provided support for some early versions of Mac OS. A new version of Xcode and the underlying command-line compilers supported building universal binaries that would run on either architecture.

PowerPC-only software is supported with Apple's official binary translation software, Rosetta, though applications eventually had to be rewritten to run properly on the newer versions released for Intel processors. Apple initially encouraged developers to produce universal binaries with support for both PowerPC and Intel. PowerPC binaries suffer a performance penalty when run on Intel Macs through Rosetta. Moreover, some PowerPC software, such as kernel extensions and System Preferences plugins, are not supported on Intel Macs at all. Plugins for Safari need to be compiled for the same platform as Safari, so when Safari is running on Intel, it requires plug-ins that have been compiled as Intel-only or universal binaries, so PowerPC-only plug-ins will not work. While Intel Macs can run PowerPC, Intel, and universal binaries, PowerPC Macs support only universal and PowerPC builds.

Support for the PowerPC platform was dropped following the transition. In 2009, Apple announced at WWDC that Mac OS X 10.6 Snow Leopard would drop support for PowerPC processors and be Intel-only. Rosetta continued to be offered as an optional download or installation choice in Snow Leopard before it was discontinued with Mac OS X 10.7 Lion. In addition, new versions of Mac OS X first- and third-party software increasingly required Intel processors, including new versions of iLife, iWork, Aperture and Logic Pro.

=== Intel–Apple silicon transition ===
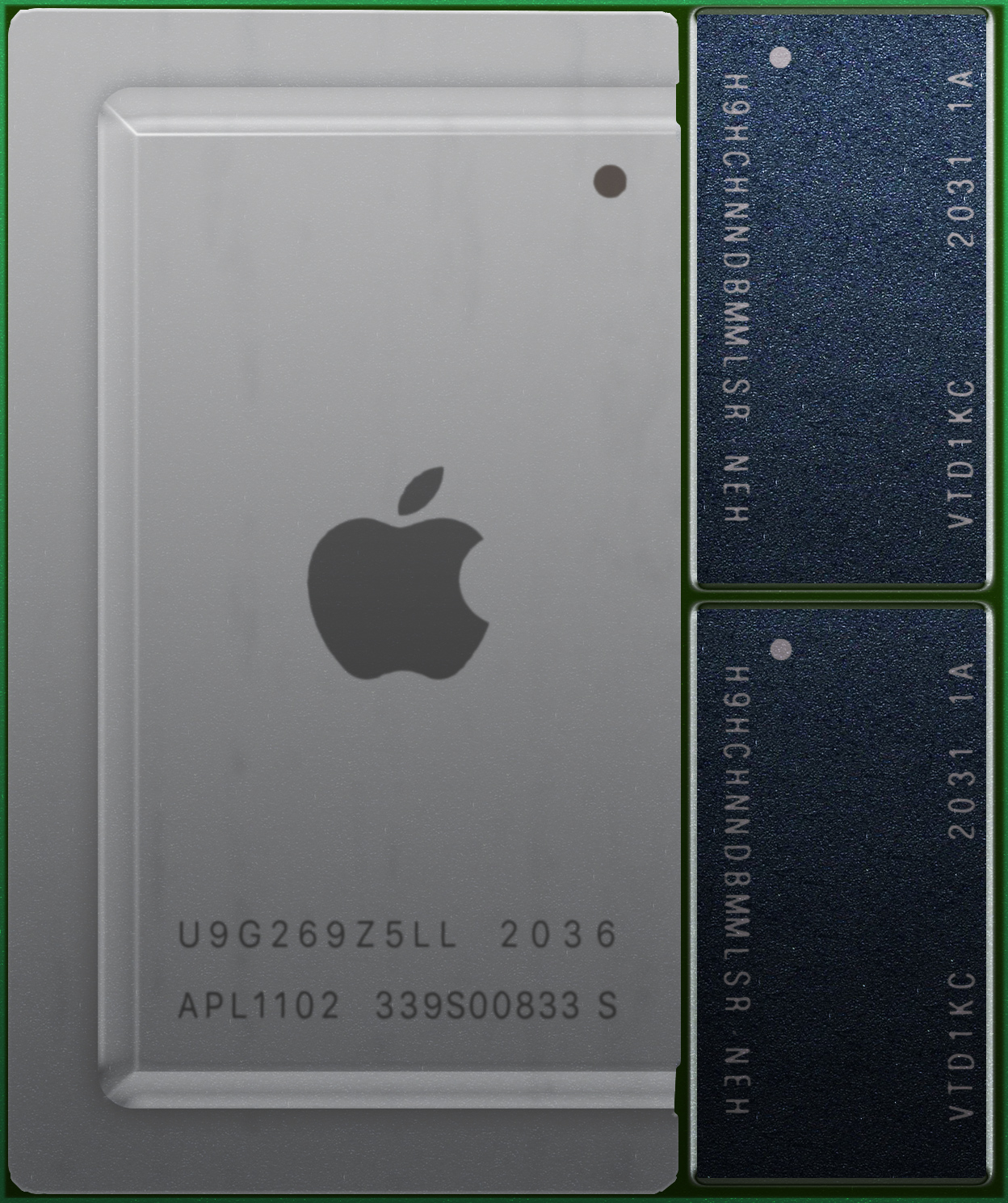
An illustration of Apple's M1 processor

Rumors of Apple shifting Macs from Intel to in-house ARM processors used by iOS devices began circulating as early as 2011, and ebbed and flowed throughout the 2010s. Rumors intensified in 2020, when numerous reports announced that the company would announce its shift to its custom processors at WWDC.

Apple officially announced its shift to processors designed in-house on June 22, 2020, at WWDC 2020, with the transition planned to last for approximately two years. The first release of macOS to support ARM was macOS Big Sur. Big Sur and later versions support Universal 2 binaries, which are applications consisting of both Intel (x86-64) and Apple silicon (AArch64) binaries; when launched, only the appropriate binary is run. Additionally, Intel binaries can be run on Apple silicon-based Macs using the Rosetta 2 binary translation software. The transition was completed at WWDC 2023 with the announcement of the Apple silicon Mac Pro, ending the transition in 3 years, slightly behind schedule.

The change in processor architecture allows Macs with ARM processors to be able to run iOS and iPadOS apps natively.

== Features ==
=== User interface ===
The macOS user interface places a menu bar along the top edge of the screen, containing the Apple menu and application menus at the start, and status menus at the end. The Dock is placed along the bottom of the screen by default, and contains icons for pinned and active applications, file and folder shortcuts, minimized windows, and the Trash (or Bin). On most windows, the start of the title bar has three buttons resembling a horizontal traffic light, which respectively close, minimize, and resize the window.

Apple has continued to change aspects of the macOS appearance and design, particularly with tweaks to the appearance of windows and the menu bar. Since 2012, Apple has sold almost all of its Mac models with high-resolution Retina displays, and macOS and its APIs have extensive support for resolution-independent development on supporting high-resolution displays. Reviewers have described Apple's support for the technology as superior to that on Windows.

The human interface guidelines published by Apple for macOS are followed by many applications, giving them consistent user interface and keyboard shortcuts. Services available in every Cocoa application include spelling and grammar checkers, special characters palette, color picker, font chooser and dictionary. The graphics system OpenGL composites windows onto the screen to allow hardware-accelerated drawing. This technology, introduced in version 10.2, is called Quartz Extreme, a component of Quartz. Quartz's internal imaging model correlates well with the Portable Document Format (PDF) imaging model, making it easy to output PDF to multiple devices. As a side result, PDF viewing and creating PDF documents from any application are built-in features. Reflecting its popularity with design users, macOS also has system support for a variety of professional video and image formats and includes an extensive pre-installed font library, featuring many prominent brand-name designs.

==== Aqua ====
The original Aqua user interface as seen in the Mac OS X Public Beta from 2000

A major addition between the classic Mac OS and the first major release of Mac OS X was Aqua, a design language with water-like elements. It was designed to appear lickable. Every window element, text, graphic, or widget was drawn on-screen using spatial anti-aliasing technology. The preexisting ColorSync technology was improved and built into the core drawing engine, to provide color matching for printing and multimedia professionals. Drop shadows were added around windows and isolated text elements to provide a sense of depth. New interface elements were integrated, including sheets (dialog boxes attached to specific windows) and drawers, which would slide out and provide options.

The use of soft edges, translucent colors, and pinstripes, similar to the hardware design of the first iMacs, brought more texture and color to the user interface when compared to what Mac OS 9 and Mac OS X Server 1.0's Platinum appearance had offered. According to Siracusa, the introduction of Aqua and its departure from the then conventional look "hit like a ton of bricks." Bruce Tognazzini (who founded the original Apple Human Interface Group) said that the Aqua interface in Mac OS X 10.0 represented a step backwards in usability compared with the original Mac OS interface. Third-party developers started producing skins for customizable applications and other operating systems which mimicked the Aqua appearance. To some extent, Apple has used the successful transition to this design as leverage, at various times threatening legal action against people who make or distribute software with an interface the company says is derived from its copyrighted design.

Following a similar design change in iOS 7, OS X Yosemite shifted to a flat design language, simplifying many of the Aqua elements and icons. In 2025, macOS Tahoe adopted the Liquid Glass design language, which was inspired in part by Aqua.

=== Built-in components ===
The Finder is a file browser allowing quick access to all areas of the computer, which has been modified throughout subsequent releases of macOS. Quick Look has been part of the Finder since version 10.5. It allows for dynamic previews of files, including videos and multi-page documents without opening any other applications. Spotlight, a file searching technology which has been integrated into the Finder since version 10.4, allows rapid real-time searches of data files; mail messages; photos; and other information based on item properties (metadata) or content.

Apple added Exposé in version 10.3 (called Mission Control since version 10.7), a feature which includes three functions to help accessibility between windows and desktop. Its functions are to instantly reveal all open windows as thumbnails for easy navigation to different tasks, display all open windows as thumbnails from the current application, and hide all windows to access the desktop. FileVault is optional encryption of the user's files with the 128-bit Advanced Encryption Standard (AES-128).

Features introduced in version 10.4 include Automator, an application designed to create an automatic workflow for different tasks; Dashboard, a full-screen group of small applications called desktop widgets that can be called up and dismissed in one keystroke; and Front Row, a media viewer interface accessed by the Apple Remote. Sync Services allows applications to access a centralized extensible database for various elements of user data, including calendar and contact items. The operating system then managed conflicting edits and data consistency.

All system icons are scalable up to 512×512 pixels as of version 10.5 to accommodate various places where they appear in larger size, including for example the Cover Flow view, a three-dimensional graphical user interface included with iTunes, the Finder, and other Apple products for visually skimming through files and digital media libraries via cover artwork. That version also introduced Spaces, a virtual desktop implementation which enables the user to have more than one desktop and display them in an Exposé-like interface; an automatic backup technology called Time Machine, which allows users to view and restore previous versions of files and application data; and Screen Sharing was built in for the first time.

Apple has developed support for emoji characters by including the proprietary Apple Color Emoji font. Apple has also connected macOS with social networks such as Twitter and Facebook through the addition of share buttons for content such as pictures and text. Apple has brought several applications and features that originally debuted in iOS, its mobile operating system, to macOS, notably the intelligent personal assistant Siri, which was introduced in version 10.12 of macOS.

=== Multilingual support ===
There are 47 system languages available in macOS for the user at the moment of installation; the system language is used throughout the entire operating system environment. Input methods for typing in dozens of scripts can be chosen independently of the system language. Updates have added increased support for Chinese characters and interconnections with popular social networks in China.

=== Updating methods ===
macOS can be updated using the Software Update settings pane in System Settings or the softwareupdate command line utility. Until OS X 10.8 Mountain Lion, a separate Software Update application performed this functionality. In Mountain Lion and later, this was merged into the Mac App Store application, although the underlying update mechanism remains unchanged and is fundamentally different from the download mechanism used when purchasing an App Store application. In macOS 10.14 Mojave, the updating function was moved again to the Software Update settings pane.

Most Macs receive six or seven years of macOS updates. After a new major release of macOS, the previous two releases still receive occasional updates, but many security vulnerabilities are only patched in the latest macOS release.

== Release history ==
Timeline of versions

Mac OS X versions were named after big cats, with the exception of Mac OS X Server 1.0 and the original public beta, from Mac OS X 10.0 until OS X 10.9 Mavericks, when Apple switched to using California locations. Prior to its release, version 10.0 was code named internally at Apple as "Cheetah", and Mac OS X 10.1 was code named internally as "Puma". After the immense buzz surrounding Mac OS X 10.2, codenamed "Jaguar", Apple's product marketing began openly using the code names to promote the operating system. Mac OS X 10.3 was marketed as "Panther", Mac OS X 10.4 as "Tiger", Mac OS X 10.5 as "Leopard", Mac OS X 10.6 as "Snow Leopard", Mac OS X 10.7 as "Lion", OS X 10.8 as "Mountain Lion", and OS X 10.9 as "Mavericks".

"Panther", "Tiger" and "Leopard" are registered as trademarks of Apple, but "Cheetah", "Puma" and "Jaguar" have never been registered. Apple has also registered "Lynx" and "Cougar" as trademarks, though these were allowed to lapse. Computer retailer Tiger Direct sued Apple for its use of the name "Tiger". On May 16, 2005, a US federal court in the Southern District of Florida ruled that Apple's use did not infringe on Tiger Direct's trademark.

=== Mac OS X Public Beta ===
On September 13, 2000, Apple released a US$29.95 "preview" version of Mac OS X, internally codenamed Kodiak, to gain feedback from users.

The "PB", as it was known, marked the first public availability of the Aqua interface and Apple made many changes to the UI based on customer feedback. Mac OS X Public Beta expired and ceased to function in Spring 2001.

=== Mac OS X 10.0 ===
Screenshot of OS X 10.0

On March 24, 2001, Apple released Mac OS X 10.0 (internally codenamed Cheetah). The initial version was slow, incomplete, and had very few applications available at launch, mostly from independent developers. While many critics suggested that the operating system was not ready for mainstream adoption, they recognized the importance of its initial launch as a base on which to improve. Simply releasing Mac OS X was received by the Macintosh community as a great accomplishment, for attempts to overhaul the Mac OS had been underway since 1996, and had been delayed by countless setbacks.

=== Mac OS X 10.1 ===
Later that year, on September 25, 2001, Mac OS X 10.1 (internally codenamed Puma) was released. It featured increased performance and provided missing features, such as DVD playback. Apple released 10.1 as a free upgrade CD for 10.0 users, in addition to the $129 boxed version for people running Mac OS 9. It was discovered that the upgrade CDs were full install CDs that could be used with Mac OS 9 systems by removing a specific file; Apple later re-released the CDs in an actual stripped-down format that did not facilitate installation on such systems. On January 7, 2002, Apple announced that Mac OS X was to be the default operating system for all Macintosh products by the end of that month.

=== Mac OS X 10.2 Jaguar ===
On August 23, 2002, Apple followed up with Mac OS X 10.2 Jaguar, the first release to use its code name as part of the branding. It brought significant performance improvements, and an updated version of Aqua's visual design. Jaguar also included over 150 new user-facing features, including Quartz Extreme for compositing graphics directly on an ATI Radeon or Nvidia GeForce2 MX AGP-based video card with at least 16 MB of VRAM, a system-wide repository for contact information in the new Address Book, and the iChat instant messaging client. The Happy Mac icon — which had appeared during the Mac OS startup sequence since the original Macintosh — was replaced with a gray Apple logo.

=== Mac OS X 10.3 Panther ===
Mac OS X v10.3 Panther was released on October 24, 2003. It significantly improved performance and incorporated the most extensive update yet to the user interface. Panther included as many or more new features as Jaguar had the year before, including an updated Finder, incorporating a brushed-metal interface, Fast user switching, Exposé (Window manager), FileVault, Safari, iChat AV (which added video conferencing features to iChat), improved Portable Document Format (PDF) rendering and much greater Microsoft Windows interoperability. Support for some early G3 computers such as "beige" Power Macs and "WallStreet" PowerBooks was discontinued.

=== Mac OS X 10.4 Tiger ===
Screenshot of Tiger

Mac OS X 10.4 Tiger was released on April 29, 2005. Apple stated that Tiger contained more than 200 new features. As with Panther, certain older machines were no longer supported; Tiger requires a Mac with 256 MB of RAM and a built-in FireWire port. Among the new features, Tiger introduced Spotlight, Dashboard, Smart Folders, updated Mail program with Smart Mailboxes, QuickTime 7, Safari 2, Automator, VoiceOver, Core Image and Core Video. The initial release of the Apple TV used a modified version of Tiger with a different graphical interface and fewer applications and services. On January 10, 2006, Apple released the first Intel-based Macs along with the 10.4.4 update to Tiger. This operating system functioned identically on the PowerPC-based Macs and the new Intel-based machines, with the exception of the Intel release lacking support for the Classic environment.

=== Mac OS X 10.5 Leopard ===
Mac OS X 10.5 Leopard was released on October 26, 2007. It was called by Apple "the largest update of Mac OS X". It brought more than 300 new features. Leopard supports both PowerPC- and Intel x86-based Macintosh computers; support for the G3 processor was dropped and the G4 processor required a minimum clock rate of 867 MHz, and at least 512 MB of RAM to be installed. The single DVD works for all supported Macs (including 64-bit machines). New features include a new look, an updated Finder, Time Machine, Spaces, Boot Camp pre-installed, full support for 64-bit applications (including graphical applications), new features in Mail and iChat, and a number of new security features. Leopard is an Open Brand UNIX 03 registered product on the Intel platform. It was also the first BSD-based OS to receive UNIX 03 certification. Leopard dropped support for the Classic Environment and all Classic applications. It was the final version of Mac OS X to support the PowerPC architecture.

=== Mac OS X 10.6 Snow Leopard ===
Mac OS X 10.6 Snow Leopard was released on August 28, 2009. Rather than delivering big changes to the appearance and end user functionality like the previous releases of Mac OS X, Snow Leopard focused on "under the hood" changes, increasing the performance, efficiency, and stability of the operating system. For most users, the most noticeable changes were: the disk space that the operating system frees up after a clean install compared to Mac OS X 10.5 Leopard, a more responsive Finder rewritten in Cocoa, faster Time Machine backups, more reliable and user-friendly disk ejects, a more powerful version of the Preview application, as well as a faster Safari web browser. Snow Leopard only supported machines with Intel CPUs, required at least 1 GB of RAM, and dropped default support for applications built for the PowerPC architecture (Rosetta could be installed as an additional component to retain support for PowerPC-only applications).

Snow Leopard also featured new 64-bit technology capable of supporting greater amounts of RAM, improved support for multi-core processors through Grand Central Dispatch, and advanced GPU performance with OpenCL.

The 10.6.6 update also introduced support for the Mac App Store, Apple's digital distribution platform for macOS applications.

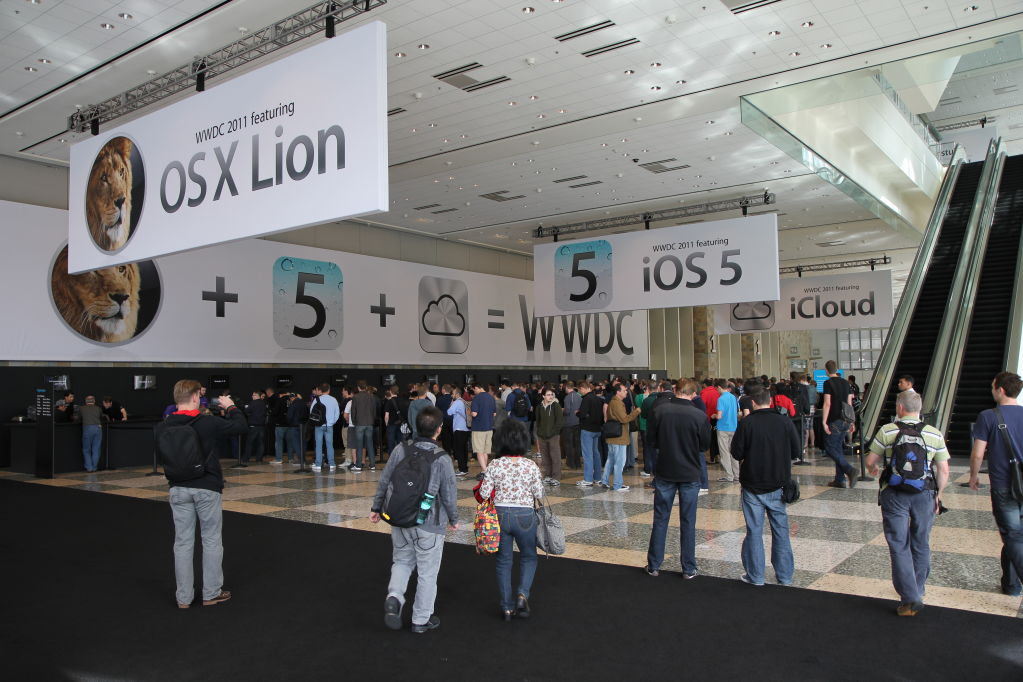
OS X Lion was announced at WWDC 2011 at Moscone West.

=== OS X 10.7 Lion ===
OS X 10.7 Lion was released on July 20, 2011. It brought developments made in Apple's iOS, such as an easily navigable display of installed applications called Launchpad and a greater use of multi-touch gestures, to the Mac. This release removed Rosetta, making it incompatible with PowerPC applications.

Changes made to the GUI include auto-hiding scrollbars that only appear when they are used, and Mission Control which unifies Exposé, Spaces, Dashboard, and full-screen applications within a single interface. Apple also made changes to applications: they resume in the same state as they were before they were closed, similar to iOS. Documents auto-save by default.

=== OS X 10.8 Mountain Lion ===
OS X 10.8 Mountain Lion was released on July 25, 2012. Following the release of Lion the previous year, it was the first of the annual rather than two-yearly updates to OS X (and later macOS), which also closely aligned with the annual iOS operating system updates. It incorporates some features seen in iOS 5, which include Game Center, support for iMessage in the new Messages messaging application, and Reminders as a to-do list app separate from iCal (which was renamed to Calendar, like the iOS app). It also includes support for storing iWork documents in iCloud. Notification Center, which makes its debut in Mountain Lion, is a desktop version similar to the one in iOS 5.0 and higher. Application pop-ups are now concentrated on the corner of the screen, and the Center itself is pulled from the right side of the screen. Mountain Lion also includes more Chinese features including support for Baidu as an option for Safari search engine, QQ, 163.com and 126.com services for Mail, Contacts and Calendar, Youku, Tudou and Sina Weibo are integrated into share sheets.

Starting with Mountain Lion, Apple software updates (including the OS) are distributed via the App Store. This updating mechanism replaced the Apple Software Update utility.

=== OS X 10.9 Mavericks ===
Screenshot of OS X Mavericks

OS X 10.9 Mavericks was released on October 22, 2013. It is a free upgrade to all users running Snow Leopard or later with a 64-bit Intel processor. Its changes include the addition of the previously iOS-only Maps and iBooks applications, improvements to the Notification Center, enhancements to several applications, and many under-the-hood improvements.

=== OS X 10.10 Yosemite ===
OS X 10.10 Yosemite was released on October 16, 2014. It features a redesigned user interface similar to that of iOS 7, intended to feature a more minimal, text-based 'flat' design, with use of translucency effects and intensely saturated colors. Apple's showcase new feature in Yosemite is Handoff, which enables users with iPhones running iOS 8.1 or later to answer phone calls, receive and send SMS messages, and complete unfinished iPhone emails on their Mac. As of OS X 10.10.3, Photos replaced iPhoto and Aperture.

=== OS X 10.11 El Capitan ===
Screenshot of El Capitan

OS X 10.11 El Capitan was released on September 30, 2015. Similar to Mac OS X 10.6 Snow Leopard, Apple described this release as emphasizing "refinements to the Mac experience" and "improvements to system performance". Refinements include public transport built into the Maps application, GUI improvements to the Notes application, adopting San Francisco as the system font for clearer legibility, and the introduction of System Integrity Protection.

The Metal API, first introduced in iOS 8, was also included in this operating system for "all Macs since 2012". According to Apple, Metal accelerates system-level rendering by up to 50 percent, resulting in faster graphics performance for everyday apps. Metal also delivers up to 10 times faster draw call performance for more fluid experience in games and pro apps.

=== macOS 10.12 Sierra ===
macOS 10.12 Sierra was released to the public on September 20, 2016. New features include the addition of Siri, optimized storage, and updates to Photos, Messages, and iTunes.

=== macOS 10.13 High Sierra ===
macOS 10.13 High Sierra was released to the public on September 25, 2017. Like OS X El Capitan and OS X Mountain Lion, High Sierra is a refinement-based update having very few new features visible to the user, including updates to Safari, Photos, and Mail, among other changes.

The major change under the hood is the switch to the Apple File System, optimized for the solid-state storage used in most new Mac computers.

=== macOS 10.14 Mojave ===
macOS 10.14 Mojave was released on September 24, 2018. The update introduced a system-wide dark mode and several new apps lifted from iOS, such as Apple News. It was the first version to require a GPU that supports Metal. Mojave also changed the system software update mechanism from the App Store (where it had been since OS X Mountain Lion) to a new panel in System Preferences. App updates remain in the App Store.

=== macOS 10.15 Catalina ===
macOS 10.15 Catalina was released on October 7, 2019. Updates included enhanced voice control, and bundled apps for music, video, and podcasts that together replace the functions of iTunes, and the ability to use an iPad as an external monitor. Catalina officially dropped support for 32-bit applications.

=== macOS 11 Big Sur ===
macOS Big Sur was announced during the WWDC keynote speech on June 22, 2020, and it was made available to the general public on November 12, 2020. This is the first time the major version number of the operating system has been incremented since the Mac OS X Public Beta in 2000. It brings Arm support, new icons, and aesthetic user interface changes to the system.

=== macOS 12 Monterey ===
macOS Monterey was announced during the WWDC keynote speech on June 7, 2021, and released on October 25, 2021, introducing Universal Control (which allows input devices to be used with multiple devices simultaneously), Focus modes (which allows selectively limiting notifications and alerts depending on user-defined user or work modes), Shortcuts (a task automation framework previously only available on iOS and iPadOS expected to replace Automator), a redesigned Safari web browser, and updates and improvements to FaceTime.

=== macOS 13 Ventura ===
macOS Ventura was announced during the WWDC keynote speech on June 6, 2022 and released on October 24, 2022. It came with the redesigned System Preferences (named System Settings) to a more iOS-like design, and the new Freeform, Weather and Clock apps that run natively on Mac. Users can use an iPhone as a webcam for video conferencing with Continuity Camera. Siri's appearance was changed to look more like the versions on iOS 14 and iPadOS 14. Mail introduced schedule send and undo send for emails, and Message also got the ability to undo send and edit messages. Stage Manager was introduced as a new way to organize all open windows in a desktop. Maps gained the feature for multiple-stop routes, Metal 3 was added with support for spatial and temporal image upscaling, Lockdown Mode was added to reduce the risk of a cyberattack, and the ability to play ambient background sounds was added as an accessibility feature in System Settings.

=== macOS 14 Sonoma ===
Screenshot of Sonoma

macOS Sonoma was announced during the WWDC keynote speech on June 5, 2023, and released on September 26, 2023. macOS Sonoma revamped widgets—they can now be placed anywhere on the desktop. Game mode optimizes game performance by prioritizing gaming tasks and allocating more GPU and CPU capacity to the game, and by doing so is able to provide smoother frame rates for gameplay. The Spotlight Search bar and all app icons were made even more rounded, smoother animations were implemented for notifications and the lock screen, and new slow-motion screensavers of different locations worldwide were added. When logged in, they gradually slow down and become the desktop wallpaper.

=== macOS 15 Sequoia ===
macOS Sequoia was announced during the WWDC keynote speech on June 10, 2024. It adds support for Apple Intelligence features (for example a redesigned Siri, writing tools, Image Playground, Genmoji, and system-wide integration with GPT-4o), as well as adding iPhone Mirroring, a new dedicated Passwords app for faster autofilling and more organized passwords, and window tiling—a similar feature to Microsoft Windows' Aero Snap window snapping feature.

=== macOS 26 Tahoe ===
macOS Tahoe was announced on June 9, 2025, during the WWDC 2025 keynote address. It is the first macOS version to feature the new Liquid Glass design introduced across Apple operating systems that year. It is also the first macOS to use Apple's new release number convention, which gives all of Apple's operating systems the same version number. Tahoe is the last version to be compatible with Intel-based Macs. It was released on September 15, 2025.

=== macOS 27 Golden Gate ===
macOS Golden Gate was announced at WWDC 2026 on June 8, 2026. It introduces visual intelligence, redesigns Siri, and brings Apple Intelligence features to apps such as Safari and Passwords. Golden Gate also improves Liquid Glass on windows and sidebars, and allows users to adjust the system opacity. It was released on September 14, 2026. It is the first version of macOS to run exclusively on Macs with Apple silicon and the last version with full Rosetta 2 functionality.

== Security ==
Apple publishes Apple Platform Security documents to lay out the security protections built into macOS and Mac hardware.

macOS supports additional hardware-based security features on Apple silicon Macs:

- Write xor execute prevents some security vulnerabilities by making memory pages either writable or executable, but not both.
- PCIe or Thunderbolt devices are prevented by IOMMUs from reading system memory that is not explicitly mapped to them, unlike Intel-based Macs.

macOS's optional Lockdown Mode enables additional protections, such as disabling just-in-time compilation for Safari's JavaScript engine, blocks FaceTime calls unless you have previously called that person or contact, location information is excluded when photos are being shared, Game Center is disabled, and accessories have to be approved and your Mac has to be unlocked. These prevent some vulnerabilities within macOS.

Only the latest major release of macOS (macOS Golden Gate as of September 2026) receives patches for all known security vulnerabilities. The previous two releases receive some security updates, but not for all vulnerabilities known to Apple. In 2021, Apple fixed a critical privilege escalation vulnerability in macOS Big Sur, but a fix remained unavailable for the previous release, macOS Catalina, for 234 days, until Apple was informed that the vulnerability was being used to infect the computers of Hong Kong citizens and other people who visited Hong Kong pro-democracy websites that may have been blocked in Hong Kong.

macOS Ventura added support for Rapid Security Response (RSR) updates and Lockdown Mode. Rapid Security Response updates may require a reboot, but take less than a minute to install. In an analysis, Hackintosh developer Mykola Grymalyuk noted that RSR updates can only fix userland vulnerabilities, and cannot patch the macOS kernel. Lockdown Mode is an optional security feature designed to provide extreme protection for users who may be at risk of targeted cyberattacks, such as journalists, activists, and public figures. This mode significantly alters the functionality of the device to enhance security against sophisticated threats, particularly from spyware and state-sponsored attacks. Apple says most people are never impacted by these attacks.

=== Malware and spyware ===
In its earlier years, Mac OS X enjoyed a near-absence of the types of malware and spyware that have affected Microsoft Windows users. macOS has a smaller usage share compared to Windows. Worms, as well as potential vulnerabilities, were noted in 2006, which led some industry analysts and anti-virus companies to issue warnings that Apple's Mac OS X is not immune to malware. Increasing market share coincided with additional reports of a variety of attacks. In early 2011, Mac OS X experienced a large increase in malware attacks, and malware such as Mac Defender, MacProtector, and MacGuard was seen as an increasing problem for Mac users. At first, the malware installer required the user to enter the administrative password, but later versions installed without user input. Initially, Apple support staff were instructed not to assist in the removal of the malware or admit the existence of the malware issue, but as the malware spread, a support document was issued. Apple announced an OS X update to fix the problem. An estimated 100,000 users were affected. Apple releases security updates for macOS regularly, as well as signature files containing malware signatures for Xprotect, an anti-malware feature part of File Quarantine present since Mac OS X Snow Leopard.

== Reception ==
=== Usage share ===
As of January 2023, macOS is the second-most widely used general-purpose desktop operating system used on the World Wide Web following Microsoft Windows, with a 15.33% usage share, according to statistics compiled by StatCounter.

=== Promotion ===
As a hardware company, Apple has mostly promoted macOS to sell Macs, with promotion of macOS updates focused on existing users, promotion at Apple Store and other retail partners, or through events for developers. In larger scale advertising campaigns, Apple specifically promoted Mac OS X/macOS as better for handling media and other home-user applications, and comparing Mac OS X (especially versions such as Tiger and Leopard) with the heavy criticism Microsoft received for the long-awaited Windows Vista operating system.

== See also ==
- Dock (macOS)
- Classic Mac OS (1984–2001)
- Comparison of BSD operating systems
- Comparison of operating systems
- List of operating systems
- List of Mac software
- Mac operating systems
