= Darwin (operating system) =

Computer operating system

- Developer: Apple
- Written in: C, C++, Objective-C, assembly language
- OS family: Unix-like, FreeBSD, BSD
- Working state: Current
- Source model: Currently open source with proprietary components, previously open source
- Initial release: November 15, 2000; 25 years ago
- Latest release: 27.0.0 / September 14, 2026; 56 days ago
- Latest preview: 27.2.0 / September 16, 2026; 54 days ago
- Repository: github.com/apple-oss-distributions/distribution-macOS
- Supported platforms: Current: ARM64, x86-64 Historical: PowerPC (32-bit and 64-bit), IA-32, 32-bit ARM (32-bit ARM support is closed-source)
- Kernel type: Hybrid (XNU)
- Influenced by: NeXTSTEP, FreeBSD, Mach
- Default user interface: Command-line interface (Unix shell)
- License: Mostly Apple Public Source License (APSL), with closed-source drivers
- Official website: opensource.apple.com/releases/

Darwin is the core Unix-like operating system of macOS, iOS, watchOS, tvOS, iPadOS, audioOS, visionOS, and bridgeOS. It previously existed as an independent open-source operating system, first released by Apple in 2000. It is composed of code derived from NeXTSTEP, FreeBSD and other BSD operating systems, Mach, and other free software projects' code, as well as code developed by Apple. Darwin's unofficial mascot is Hexley the Platypus.

Darwin is mostly POSIX-compatible, but has never, by itself, been certified as compatible with any version of POSIX. From Leopard to Tahoe, macOS was certified as compatible with the Single UNIX Specification version 3 (SUSv3).

== History ==
Simplified history of Unix-like operating systems

The heritage of Darwin began with Unix derivatives supplemented by aspects of NeXT's NeXTSTEP operating system (later, since version 4.0, known as OPENSTEP), first released in 1989. After Apple bought NeXT in 1996, it announced it would base its next operating system on OPENSTEP. This was developed into Rhapsody in 1997, Mac OS X Server 1.0 in 1999, Mac OS X Public Beta in 2000, and Mac OS X 10.0 in 2001.

In 1999, Apple announced it would release the source code for the Mach 2.5 microkernel, BSD Unix 4.4 OS, and the Apache Web server components of Mac OS X Server. At the time, interim CEO Steve Jobs alluded to British naturalist Charles Darwin by announcing "because it's about evolution". In 2000, the core operating system components of Mac OS X were released as open-source software under the Apple Public Source License (APSL) as Darwin; the higher-level components, such as the Cocoa and Carbon frameworks, remained closed-source.

Up to Darwin 8.0.1, released in April 2005, Apple released a binary installer (as an ISO image) after each major Mac OS X release that allowed one to install Darwin on PowerPC and Intel x86 systems as a standalone operating system. Minor updates were released as packages that were installed separately. Darwin is now only available as source code. As of January 2023, Apple no longer mentions Darwin by name on its Open Source website and only publishes an incomplete collection of open-source projects relating to macOS and iOS.

== Design ==
Diagram of macOS architecture

=== Kernel ===
The kernel of Darwin is XNU, a hybrid kernel which uses Open Software Foundation Mach Kernel (OSFMK) 7.3 from the OSF, various elements of FreeBSD (including the process model, network stack, and virtual file system), and an object-oriented device driver API called IOKit. The hybrid kernel design provides the flexibility of a microkernel and the performance of a monolithic kernel.

=== Hardware and software support ===
The last bootable full release of Darwin supported 32-bit and 64-bit Apple PowerPC systems and 32-bit Intel PCs.

Darwin currently includes support for the 64-bit x86-64 variant of the Intel x86 processors used in Intel-based Macs and the 64-bit ARM processors used in the iPhone 5S and later, the 6th generation iPod Touch, the 5th generation iPad and later, the iPad Air family, the iPad Mini 2 and later, the iPad Pro family, the fourth generation and later Apple TVs, the HomePod family, and Macs with Apple silicon such as the 2020 Apple M1 Macs, as well as the Raspberry Pi 3B. An open-source port of the XNU kernel exists that supports Darwin on Intel and AMD x86 platforms not officially supported by Apple, though it does not appear to have been updated since 2009. An open-source port of the XNU kernel also exists for ARM platforms, though it has not been updated since 2016. Older versions supported some or all of 32-bit PowerPC, 64-bit PowerPC, 32-bit x86, and 32-bit ARM.

It supports the POSIX API by way of its BSD lineage (largely FreeBSD userland), so a large number of programs written for various other UNIX-like systems can be compiled on Darwin with no changes to the source code.

Darwin does not include many of the defining elements of macOS, such as the Carbon and Cocoa APIs or the Quartz Compositor and Aqua user interface, and thus cannot run Mac applications. It does, however, support a number of lesser-known features of macOS, such as mDNSResponder, which is the multicast DNS responder and a core component of the Bonjour networking technology, and launchd, an advanced service management framework.

== License ==
In July 2003, Apple released Darwin under version 2.0 of the Apple Public Source License (APSL), which the Free Software Foundation (FSF) qualifies as a free software license. The APSL is similar to AGPL, but unlike AGPL it is incompatible with the GNU General Public License.

Previous versions of the APSL license did not meet the FSF definition of free software, although they did meet the requirements of the Open Source Definition.

== Release history ==
The following is a table of major Darwin releases with their dates of release and their derivative operating system releases. Note that the corresponding releases may have been released on a different date.

=== Darwin 0–8 and corresponding Mac OS X releases ===
Version	Date	Corresponding releases	Notes
0.1	March 16, 1999	Mac OS X Server 1.0 releases	Initial release; 0.1 is contrived (for sorting and identification) as this identified itself simply as Rhapsody 5.3
0.2	April 14, 1999	Mac OS X Server 1.0 releases	Mac OS X Server 1.0.1
0.3	August 5, 1999	Mac OS X Server 1.0 releases	Based on Rhapsody 5.5: ISO image is available on archive.org; After this point the kernel changed from the NeXTSTEP/OPENSTEP/Rhapsody to the newer XNU for Mac OS X
1.0	April 12, 2000		Developer preview 3: ISO image is available on archive.org
1.1	April 5, 2000		Developer preview 4
1.2.1	November 15, 2000	Mac OS X Public Beta (code-named "Kodiak")	
1.3.1	April 13, 2001	Mac OS X v10.0 (code-named "Cheetah")	First commercial release of Darwin; All releases of Cheetah (v10.0.0–4) had the same version of Darwin.
1.4.1	October 2, 2001	Mac OS X v10.1 (code-named "Puma")	Performance improvements to "boot time, real-time threads, thread management, cache flushing, and preemption handling"; Support for SMB network file system; Wget replaced with cURL.
5.1	November 12, 2001	Mac OS X v10.1 (code-named "Puma")	Mac OS X v10.1.1: Change in numbering scheme to match the Mac OS X build numbering scheme
5.5	June 5, 2002	Mac OS X v10.1 (code-named "Puma")	Mac OS X v10.1.5
6.0.1	September 23, 2002	Mac OS X v10.2 (code-named "Jaguar")	GCC upgraded from 2 to 3.1; IPv6 and IPSec support; mDNSResponder service discovery daemon (Rendezvous); Addition of CUPS, Ruby, and Python; Journaling support in HFS+ (Darwin 6.2); Application profiles ("pre-heat files") for faster program launching.
6.8	October 3, 2003	Mac OS X v10.2 (code-named "Jaguar")	Mac OS X v10.2.8
7.0	October 24, 2003	Mac OS X Panther	Mac OS X v10.3.0: BSD layer synchronized with FreeBSD 5; Automatic file defragmentation, hot-file clustering and optional case sensitivity in HFS+; Bash instead of tcsh as default shell; Read-only NTFS support (Darwin 7.9)
7.9	April 15, 2005	Mac OS X Panther	Mac OS X v10.3.9
8.0	April 29, 2005	Mac OS X Tiger; Mac OS X for Apple TV	Mac OS X v10.4.0: Download for Darwin 8.0.1 can be found here; Mac OS X for Apple TV in Darwin 8.8.2; Stable kernel programming interface, finer-grained kernel locking, 64-bit BSD layer; launchd service management framework; Extended file attributes, access control lists; Commands such as cp and mv updated to preserve extended attributes and resource forks
8.11	November 14, 2007	Mac OS X Tiger; Mac OS X for Apple TV	Mac OS X v10.4.11

The jump in version numbers from Darwin 1.4.1 to 5.1 with the release of Mac OS X v10.1.1 was designed to tie Darwin to the Mac OS X version and build numbering system, which in turn is inherited from NeXTSTEP. In the build numbering system of macOS, every version has a unique beginning build number, which identifies what whole version of macOS it is part of. Mac OS X v10.0 had build numbers starting with 4, 10.1 had build numbers starting with 5, and so forth (earlier build numbers represented developer releases).

=== Darwin 9; iPhone OS introduced ===
Version	Date	Corresponding releases	Notes
9.0	October 26, 2007	Mac OS X Leopard; iPhone OS 1	Mac OS X v10.5.0: iPhone OS 1 support in Darwin 9.0.0d1; Full POSIX compliance, improved hierarchical process scheduling model, dynamically allocated swap files, dynamic resource limits (for files and processes), process sandboxing, address space layout randomization, DTrace tracing framework, file system events daemon, directory hard links; Apache 1.3 and PHP 4 updated to Apache 2.2 and PHP 5, read-only ZFS support.; First Darwin core used for iPhone devices.
9.8	August 5, 2009	Mac OS X Leopard; iPhone OS 1	Mac OS X v.10.5.8

=== Darwin 10-11; iPhone OS rebranded to iOS ===
Version	Date	Corresponding releases	Notes
10.0	August 28, 2009	Mac OS X Snow Leopard; iPhone OS 3	Mac OS X v10.6.0: End of official support for PPC architecture (although several fat binaries, such as Kernel, still contain PPC images); 64-bit kernel and drivers; libdispatch task parallelization framework; OpenCL heterogeneous computing framework; Initial support for Automatic Reference Counting; Support for blocks in C; Transparent file compression in HFS+.
10.8	June 23, 2011	Mac OS X Snow Leopard; iPhone OS 3	Mac OS X v10.6.8
11.0.0	July 20, 2011	Mac OS X Lion; iOS 4.3	Mac OS X v10.7.0: XNU no longer supports PPC binaries (fat binary only for i386, x86_64).; XNU requires an x86_64 processor, except for iOS which is ARM based.; Improved sandboxing of applications; Complete support for Automatic Reference Counting
11.4.2	October 4, 2012	Mac OS X Lion; iOS 4.3	Mac OS X v10.7.5 (supplemental)

=== Darwin 12–15; Mac OS X rebranded into OS X ===
Version	Date	Corresponding releases	Notes
12.0.0	February 16, 2012	OS X Mountain Lion	OS X v10.8.0: Mac OS X was rebranded into OS X.; Objective-C garbage collection was deprecated in favor of Automatic Reference Counting
12.6.0	January 27, 2015	OS X Mountain Lion	OS X v10.8.5 (with Security Update 2015-001)
13.0.0	June 11, 2013	OS X Mavericks; iOS 6	OS X v10.9.0: Virtual memory compression; Timer coalescing; OpenGL 4.1 and OpenCL 1.2; Server Message Block version 2 (SMB2) is now the default protocol for sharing files instead of AFP. This is to increase performance and cross-platform compatibility.; IPoTB (Internet Protocol over Thunderbolt Bridge).; The Open Transport API has been removed
13.4.0	September 17, 2014	OS X Mavericks; iOS 6	OS X v10.9.5
14.0.0	September 18, 2014	OS X Yosemite; iOS 7, iOS 8; watchOS 1	OS X v10.10.0
14.5.0	August 13, 2015	OS X Yosemite; iOS 7, iOS 8; watchOS 1	OS X v10.10.5
15.0.0	September 16, 2015	OS X El Capitan; iOS 9; watchOS 2; tvOS 9	OS X v10.11.0 and iOS 9.0: System Integrity Protection. Protects certain system parts from being modified or tampered with by a process even if run by root or by a user with root privileges.; sudo is configured with the "tty_tickets" flag by default, restricting the session timeout to the terminal session (such as a window or tab) in which the user authenticated the program.; LibreSSL replaces OpenSSL
15.6.0	July 18, 2016	OS X El Capitan; iOS 9; watchOS 2; tvOS 9	OS X v10.11.6 and iOS 9.3.3

=== Darwin 16–19; OS X rebranded into macOS ===
Version	Date	Corresponding releases	Notes
16.0.0	September 13, 2016	macOS Sierra; iOS 10; watchOS 3; tvOS 10; bridgeOS 1	macOS v10.12.0 and iOS 10.0.1 (initial release version): OS X was rebranded into macOS.; Writing to /Volumes directory is now restricted to root user or any user with root privileges; System Integrity Protection now covers /Library/Application Support/com.apple.TCC directory that contains a list of applications that are allowed to "control the computer"; Objective-C garbage collector removed and replaced by Automatic Reference Counting that was introduced with Darwin v12.0 (OS X v10.8). Objective-C applications that use garbage collection will no longer work.; Native support for PPTP was removed.
16.5.0	March 27, 2017	macOS Sierra; iOS 10; watchOS 3; tvOS 10; bridgeOS 1	macOS v10.12.4 and iOS 10.3: Changed filesystem from HFS+ to APFS on iOS devices. APFS is already available on macOS since 10.12.0 but can't be used on boot partition.
16.6.0	July 19, 2017	macOS Sierra; iOS 10; watchOS 3; tvOS 10; bridgeOS 1	macOS v10.12.6 and iOS 10.3.3
17.0.0	September 19, 2017	macOS High Sierra; iOS 11; watchOS 4; tvOS 11; bridgeOS 2	APFS replaces HFS+ as the default filesystem for boot partition in macOS on Macs with flash storage. On Macs with HDDs, the boot partition must be reformatted to use APFS.; ntpd replaced by timed as a time synchronization service; FTP and telnet commands are removed.; Kernel extensions ("kexts") will require explicit approval by the user before being able to run.
17.5.0	March 29, 2018	macOS High Sierra; iOS 11; watchOS 4; tvOS 11; bridgeOS 2	macOS 10.13.4: Support for external graphics processors using Thunderbolt 3, and removes support for external graphics processors using Thunderbolt 1 and 2.
17.6.0	June 1, 2018	macOS High Sierra; iOS 11; watchOS 4; tvOS 11; bridgeOS 2	macOS v10.13.5
17.7.0	July 9, 2018	macOS High Sierra; iOS 11; watchOS 4; tvOS 11; bridgeOS 2	macOS v10.13.6 and iOS 11.4.1
18.0.0	September 24, 2018	macOS Mojave; iOS 12; watchOS 5; tvOS 12; bridgeOS 3	
18.2.0	October 30, 2018	macOS Mojave; iOS 12; watchOS 5; tvOS 12; bridgeOS 3	macOS v10.14.1 and iOS 12.1: Added support for the new Radeon Vega 20 GPUs in the new MacBooks
19.0.0	September 19, 2019	macOS Catalina; iOS 13; watchOS 6; tvOS 13; bridgeOS 4	
19.2.0	December 10, 2019	macOS Catalina; iOS 13; watchOS 6; tvOS 13; bridgeOS 4	macOS 10.15.2 and iOS 13.3
19.3.0	January 28, 2020	macOS Catalina; iOS 13; watchOS 6; tvOS 13; bridgeOS 4	macOS 10.15.3 and iOS 13.3.1: System Extensions replace Kexts and runs in userspace, outside of the kernel.; DriverKit replaces I/O Kit. It Introduces "Dexts" (Driver Extensions) which are built using DriverKit. Driverkit is a new SDK with all new frameworks based on IOKit, but is updated and modernized. Device Drivers run in userspace, outside of the kernel.
19.4.0	March 24, 2020	macOS Catalina; iOS 13; watchOS 6; tvOS 13; bridgeOS 4	
19.5.0	April 30, 2020	macOS Catalina; iOS 13; watchOS 6; tvOS 13; bridgeOS 4	macOS 10.15.5 and iOS 13.5
19.6.0	June 1, 2020	macOS Catalina; iOS 13; watchOS 6; tvOS 13; bridgeOS 4	macOS 10.15.6 beta 2 and iOS 13.6.0 beta 2

=== Darwin 20 onwards ===
Version	Date	Corresponding releases	Notes
20.0.0	June 22, 2020	macOS Big Sur; iOS 14; watchOS 7; tvOS 14; bridgeOS 5	macOS 11.0 beta 1 and iOS 14.0 beta 1
20.1.0	September 3, 2020	macOS Big Sur; iOS 14; watchOS 7; tvOS 14; bridgeOS 5	macOS 11.0 and iOS 14.0
20.2.0	November 12, 2020	macOS Big Sur; iOS 14; watchOS 7; tvOS 14; bridgeOS 5	macOS 11.1 and iOS 14.3
20.3.0	February 1, 2021	macOS Big Sur; iOS 14; watchOS 7; tvOS 14; bridgeOS 5	macOS 11.2, iOS 14.4, iPadOS 14.4, watchOS 7.3 and tvOS 14.4.
20.4.0	April 20, 2021	macOS Big Sur; iOS 14; watchOS 7; tvOS 14; bridgeOS 5	macOS 11.3, iOS 14.5, iPadOS 14.5, watchOS 7.4 and tvOS 14.5.
20.5.0	May 24, 2021	macOS Big Sur; iOS 14; watchOS 7; tvOS 14; bridgeOS 5	macOS 11.4 and iOS 14.6
20.6.0	June 2, 2021	macOS Big Sur; iOS 14; watchOS 7; tvOS 14; bridgeOS 5	macOS 11.5 beta 2 and iOS 14.7 beta 2
21.0.0	June 7, 2021	macOS Monterey; iOS 15; watchOS 8; tvOS 15; bridgeOS 6	macOS 12.0 beta 1 and iOS 15.0 beta 1
21.0.1	October 25, 2021	macOS Monterey; iOS 15; watchOS 8; tvOS 15; bridgeOS 6	macOS 12.0
21.1.0	October 25, 2021	macOS Monterey; iOS 15; watchOS 8; tvOS 15; bridgeOS 6	macOS 12.0.1 and iOS 15.0
21.2.0	December 7, 2021	macOS Monterey; iOS 15; watchOS 8; tvOS 15; bridgeOS 6	macOS 12.1 and iOS 15.2
21.3.0	January 26, 2022	macOS Monterey; iOS 15; watchOS 8; tvOS 15; bridgeOS 6	macOS 12.2 and iOS 15.3
21.4.0	March 14, 2022	macOS Monterey; iOS 15; watchOS 8; tvOS 15; bridgeOS 6	macOS 12.3 and iOS 15.4
21.5.0	June 24, 2022	macOS Monterey; iOS 15; watchOS 8; tvOS 15; bridgeOS 6	macOS 12.4 and iOS 15.5
21.6.0	July 20, 2022	macOS Monterey; iOS 15; watchOS 8; tvOS 15; bridgeOS 6	macOS 12.5 and iOS 15.6
22.0	June 6, 2022	macOS Ventura; iOS 16; iPadOS 16; watchOS 9; tvOS 16; bridgeOS 7	macOS 13.0 beta 1, iOS 16.0, watchOS 9.0 and tvOS 16.0
22.1.0	October 24, 2022	macOS Ventura; iOS 16; iPadOS 16; watchOS 9; tvOS 16; bridgeOS 7	macOS 13.0, iOS 16.1, iPadOS 16.1, watchOS 9.1 and tvOS 16.1
22.2.0	December 13, 2022	macOS Ventura; iOS 16; iPadOS 16; watchOS 9; tvOS 16; bridgeOS 7	macOS 13.1, iOS 16.2, iPadOS 16.2, watchOS 9.2 and tvOS 16.2
22.3.0	January 23, 2023	macOS Ventura; iOS 16; iPadOS 16; watchOS 9; tvOS 16; bridgeOS 7	macOS 13.2, iOS 16.3, iPadOS 16.3, watchOS 9.3 and tvOS 16.3
22.4.0	March 27, 2023	macOS Ventura; iOS 16; iPadOS 16; watchOS 9; tvOS 16; bridgeOS 7	macOS 13.3, iOS 16.4, iPadOS 16.4, watchOS 9.4 and tvOS 16.4
22.5.0	May 18, 2023	macOS Ventura; iOS 16; iPadOS 16; watchOS 9; tvOS 16; bridgeOS 7	macOS 13.4, iOS 16.5, iPadOS 16.5, watchOS 9.5 and tvOS 16.5
22.6.0	July 24, 2023	macOS Ventura; iOS 16; iPadOS 16; watchOS 9; tvOS 16; bridgeOS 7	macOS 13.5, iOS 16.6, iPadOS 16.6, watchOS 9.6 and tvOS 16.6
23.0.0	September 18, 2023	macOS Sonoma; iOS 17; iPadOS 17; watchOS 10; tvOS 17; bridgeOS 8	macOS 14.0, iOS 17.0, iPadOS 17.0, watchOS 10.0 and tvOS 17.0
23.1.0	October 25, 2023	macOS Sonoma; iOS 17; iPadOS 17; watchOS 10; tvOS 17; bridgeOS 8	macOS 14.1, iOS 17.1, iPadOS 17.1, watchOS 10.1 and tvOS 17.1
23.2.0	November 15, 2023	macOS Sonoma; iOS 17; iPadOS 17; watchOS 10; tvOS 17; bridgeOS 8	macOS 14.2, iOS 17.2, iPadOS 17.2, watchOS 10.2 and tvOS 17.2
23.3.0	January 22, 2024	macOS Sonoma; iOS 17; iPadOS 17; watchOS 10; tvOS 17; bridgeOS 8	macOS 14.3, iOS 17.3, iPadOS 17.3, watchOS 10.3 and tvOS 17.3
23.4.0	March 5, 2024	macOS Sonoma; iOS 17; iPadOS 17; watchOS 10; tvOS 17; bridgeOS 8	macOS 14.4, iOS 17.4, iPadOS 17.4, watchOS 10.4 and tvOS 17.4
23.5.0	May 13, 2024	macOS Sonoma; iOS 17; iPadOS 17; watchOS 10; tvOS 17; bridgeOS 8	macOS 14.5, iOS 17.5, iPadOS 17.5, watchOS 10.5 and tvOS 17.5
23.6.0	July 5, 2024	macOS Sonoma; iOS 17; iPadOS 17; watchOS 10; tvOS 17; bridgeOS 8	macOS 14.6
24.0.0	September 16, 2024	macOS Sequoia; iOS 18; iPadOS 18; watchOS 11; tvOS 18; bridgeOS 9	macOS 15.0, iOS 18.0, iPadOS 18.0, watchOS 11.0, and tvOS 18.0
24.1.0	October 28, 2024	macOS Sequoia; iOS 18; iPadOS 18; watchOS 11; tvOS 18; bridgeOS 9	macOS 15.1, iOS 18.1, iPadOS 18.1, watchOS 11.1, and tvOS 18.1
24.2.0	December 11, 2024	macOS Sequoia; iOS 18; iPadOS 18; watchOS 11; tvOS 18; bridgeOS 9	macOS 15.2, iOS 18.2, iPadOS 18.2, watchOS 11.2, and tvOS 18.2
24.3.0	January 27, 2025	macOS Sequoia; iOS 18; iPadOS 18; watchOS 11; tvOS 18; bridgeOS 9	macOS 15.3, iOS 18.3, iPadOS 18.3, watchOS 11.3, and tvOS 18.3
24.4.0	March 31, 2025	macOS Sequoia; iOS 18; iPadOS 18; watchOS 11; tvOS 18; bridgeOS 9	macOS 15.4, iOS 18.4, iPadOS 18.4, watchOS 11.4, and tvOS 18.4
24.5.0	May 12, 2025	macOS Sequoia; iOS 18; iPadOS 18; watchOS 11; tvOS 18; bridgeOS 9	macOS 15.5, iOS 18.5, iPadOS 18.5, watchOS 11.5, and tvOS 18.5
24.6.0	July 29, 2025	macOS Sequoia; iOS 18; iPadOS 18; watchOS 11; tvOS 18; bridgeOS 9	macOS 15.6, iOS 18.6, iPadOS 18.6, watchOS 11.6, and tvOS 18.6
25.0.0	September 15, 2025	macOS Tahoe; iOS 26; iPadOS 26; watchOS 26; tvOS 26; bridgeOS 10	macOS, iOS, iPadOS, watchOS, and tvOS 26.0
25.1.0	November 3, 2025	macOS Tahoe; iOS 26; iPadOS 26; watchOS 26; tvOS 26; bridgeOS 10	macOS, iOS, iPadOS, watchOS, and tvOS 26.1
25.2.0	December 12, 2025	macOS Tahoe; iOS 26; iPadOS 26; watchOS 26; tvOS 26; bridgeOS 10	macOS, iOS, iPadOS, watchOS, and tvOS 26.2
25.3.0	February 11, 2026	macOS Tahoe; iOS 26; iPadOS 26; watchOS 26; tvOS 26; bridgeOS 10	macOS, iOS, iPadOS, watchOS, and tvOS 26.3
25.4.0	March 24, 2026	macOS Tahoe; iOS 26; iPadOS 26; watchOS 26; tvOS 26; bridgeOS 10	macOS, iOS, iPadOS, watchOS, and tvOS 26.4
25.5.0	May 8, 2026	macOS Tahoe; iOS 26; iPadOS 26; watchOS 26; tvOS 26; bridgeOS 10	macOS, iOS, iPadOS, watchOS, and tvOS 26.5
25.6.0	July 20, 2026	macOS Tahoe; iOS 26; iPadOS 26; watchOS 26; tvOS 26; bridgeOS 10	macOS, iOS, iPadOS, watchOS, and tvOS 26.6
27.0.0	September 14, 2026	macOS Golden Gate; iOS 27; iPadOS 27; watchOS 27; tvOS 27	macOS, iOS, iPadOS, watchOS, and tvOS 27.0
27.2.0	September 16, 2026	macOS Golden Gate; iOS 27; iPadOS 27; watchOS 27; tvOS 27	macOS, iOS, iPadOS, watchOS, and tvOS 27.2 beta

Note: the tables above contain the release dates of the corresponding OS releases. Build dates for Darwin versions are not publicly available; the commands below only give the build date for the XNU kernel.

The command uname -r in Terminal will show the Darwin version number ("20.3.0"), and the command uname -v will show the XNU build version string, which includes the Darwin version number. The command sw_vers will show the corresponding ProductName ("macOS"), the ProductVersion number ("11.2.3") and the BuildVersion string ("20D91").

== Derived projects ==
Due to the free software nature of Darwin, there have been projects that aim to modify the operating system or take Darwin’s parts for their own purpose.

Among these, DarwinBSD, OpenDarwin, and PureDarwin can be termed "alternative Darwin distributions" in a sense analogous to Linux distributions.

=== OpenDarwin ===
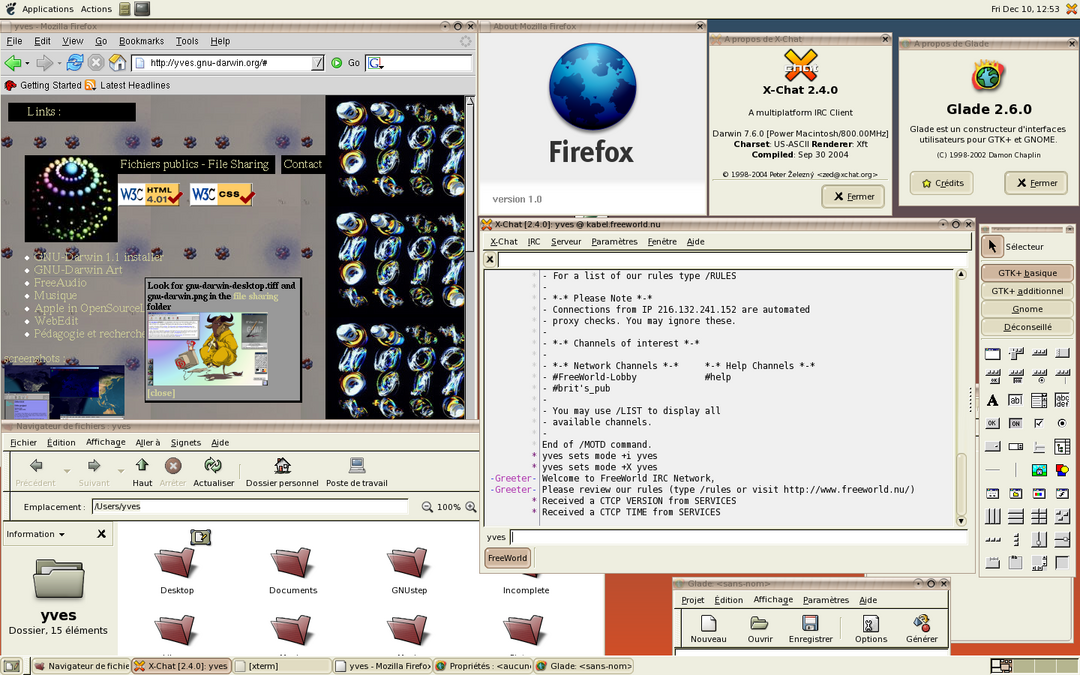
GNOME running on GNU-Darwin

OpenDarwin was a project to develop a community-led operating system based on the Darwin system. It was founded in April 2002 by Apple and Internet Systems Consortium. Its goal was to increase collaboration between Apple developers and the free software community. Apple benefited from the project because improvements to OpenDarwin would be incorporated into Darwin releases; and the free/open-source community benefited from being given complete control over its own operating system, which could then be used in free software distributions such as GNU-Darwin.

On July 25, 2006, the OpenDarwin team announced that the project was shutting down, as they felt OpenDarwin had "become a mere hosting facility for Mac OS X related projects", and that the efforts to create a standalone Darwin operating system had failed. They also state: "Availability of sources, interaction with Apple representatives, difficulty building and tracking sources, and a lack of interest from the community have all contributed to this." The last stable release was version 7.2.1, released on July 16, 2004.

=== PureDarwin ===
PureDarwin
- XFCE4 running on PureDarwin 25.5 (commit ec4ae2f)
- OS family: Unix-like
- Working state: Current
- Source model: Open-source
- Latest release: 20.5
- Latest preview: 25.5
- Repository: github.com/PureDarwin/PureDarwin
- Userland: unix shell (FreeBSD)
- License: Mostly Apple Public Source License (APSL)
- Official website: www.puredarwin.org

PureDarwin is a project to create a bootable operating system image from Apple's released source code for Darwin. Since the halt of OpenDarwin and the release of bootable images since Darwin 8.x, it has been increasingly difficult to create a full operating system as many components became closed source. In 2015 the project created a preview release based on Darwin 9 with an X11 GUI, followed by a command-line only 17.4 Beta based on Darwin 17 in 2019. As of 2026, there has been heavy development for a version based on Darwin 20 that includes two X11 DEs (XFCE and i3) and support for Wayland through sway. It can also run a patched version of Wine, and has implemented support for many x86_64 and ARM64 platforms. They also have plans to move into a newer Tahoe kernel (Darwin 25.X.0).

=== ravynOS ===
ravynOS
- OS family: Unix-like
- Working state: Current
- Source model: Open-source
- Latest release: 0.6.1
- Repository: github.com/ravynsoft/ravynos
- Userland: unix shell (FreeBSD)
- License: Mostly Apple Public Source License (APSL), MIT License (MIT), and BSD License (2-Clause BSD License)
- Official website: ravynos.com

ravynOS is a project to develop a Free and Open Source operating system that aims to be both source-compatible and eventually binary-compatible with Apple's macOS operating system. Although originally building upon a FreeBSD and NextBSD foundation, the lead dev, Zoë Knox, announced on October 28, 2025, that the operating system would be moving to a Darwin base. Since this change, work has been done on getting the legacy Darwin sources to build, as well as modernizing the build system and parts of the operating system.

=== Other derived projects ===
"Darwin distributions" (see also the other package managers below):

- GNU-Darwin was a project that ports packages of free software to Darwin. They package OS images in a way similar to a Linux distribution.
- DarwinBSD Project was a Darwin distribution using NetBSD's pkgsrc package management.

Other types of derivatives:

- The Darbat project was an experimental port of Darwin to the L4 microkernel family. It aims to be binary compatible with existing Darwin binaries.
- The Darling project is a compatibility layer for running macOS binaries on Linux systems. It uses some Darwin source code.

== Related open-source projects ==
=== Projects intended to work with Darwin ===
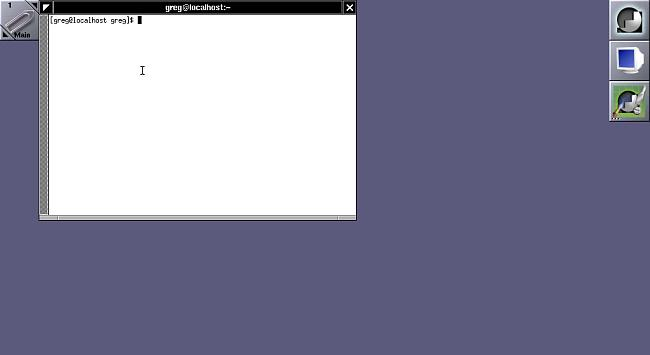
Window Maker in XDarwin

The following are not Darwin derivatives, at least not beyond the extent that any program written for an operating system is partly derived from its application programming interface and other constraints.

- XQuartz is a component of the X Window System that runs on macOS (Darwin). XDarwin, before the introduction of Apple's X11.app.
- WebKit is a browser engine primarily used in Apple's Safari web browser, as well as all web browsers on iOS and iPadOS.
- MacPorts (formerly DarwinPorts), Fink, and Homebrew are projects to port UNIX programs to the Darwin operating system and provide package management. In addition, several standard UNIX package managers—such as RPM, pkgsrc, and Portage—have Darwin ports. Some of these operate in their own namespace so as not to interfere with the base system.
- The Darwine project was a port of Wine that allows one to run Microsoft Windows software on Darwin.
- SEDarwin was a port of TrustedBSD mandatory access control framework and portions of the SELinux framework to Darwin. It was incorporated into Mac OS X 10.5.
- There are various projects that focus on driver support: e.g., wireless drivers, wired NIC drivers modem drivers, card readers, TUN/TAP and the ext2 and ext3 file systems.

=== Neither substantially based on Darwin nor mainly intended to work on it ===
The following projects re-implements parts of macOS API that are above the level of Darwin.

- GNUstep is a free software implementation of the Cocoa (formerly OpenStep) Objective-C frameworks, widget toolkit, and application development tools for Unix-like operating systems.
  - Window Maker, a window manager designed to emulate the NeXT GUI as part of the wider GNUstep project.

== See also ==
- A/UX
- mkLinux
- OSF/1
