= Mac OS X 10.1 =

2001 operating system version

- Version of the macOS operating system
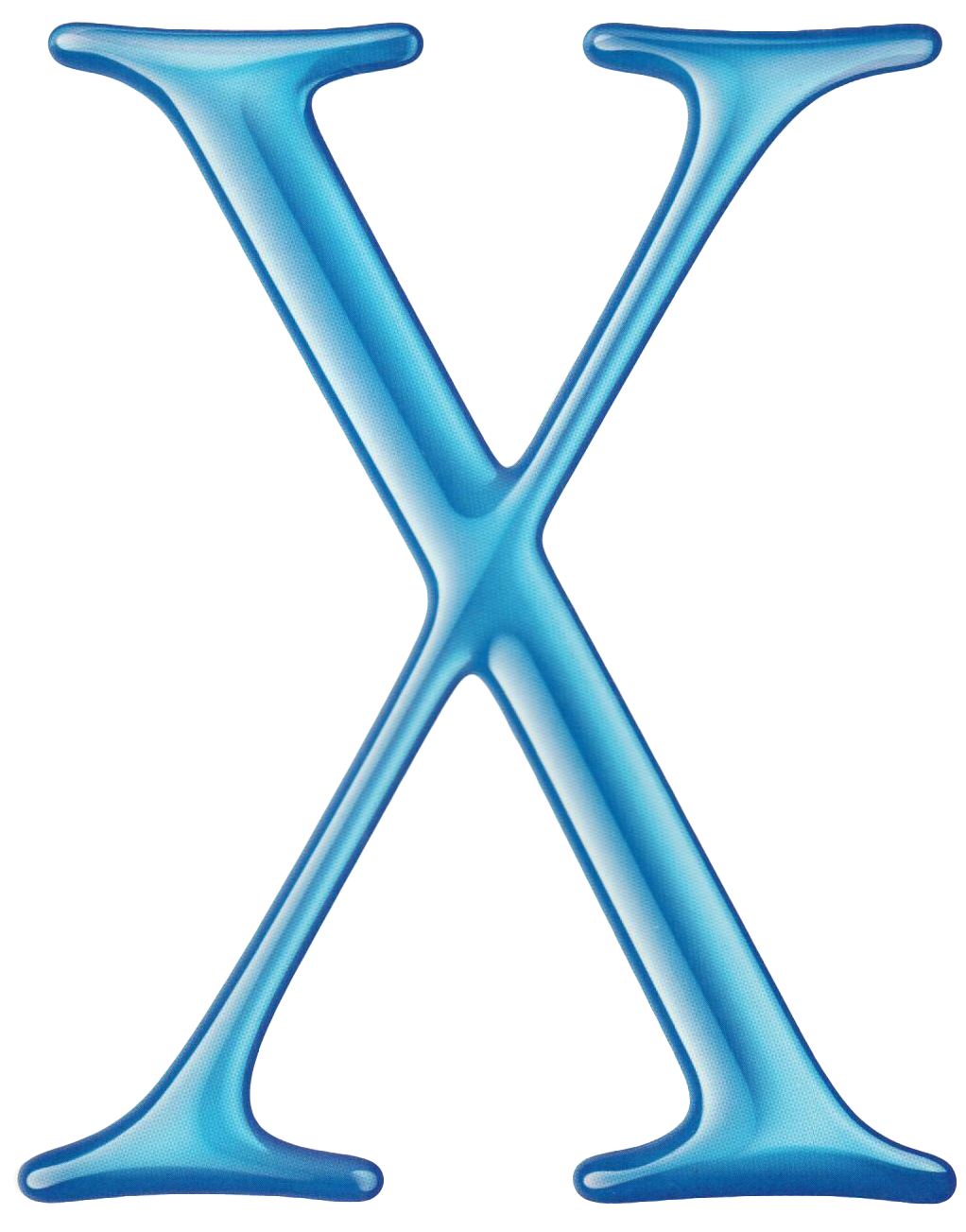

- Screenshot of Mac OS X 10.1 Puma
- Developer: Apple Computer, Inc.
- OS family: Macintosh; Unix-like
- Working state: No longer supported
- Source model: Closed, with open source components
- General availability: September 29, 2001; 25 years ago
- Latest release: 10.1.5 / June 6, 2002; 24 years ago
- Supported platforms: PowerPC
- Kernel type: Hybrid (XNU)
- License: Apple Public Source License (APSL) and Apple end-user license agreement (EULA)
- Preceded by: Mac OS X 10.0
- Succeeded by: Mac OS X 10.2 Jaguar
- Official website: Mac OS X 10.1 (archived at Wayback Machine)
- Tagline: The biggest breakthrough since point and click.

Support status
- Historical, unsupported as of November 13, 2006

Mac OS X 10.1 (code named Puma) is the second major release of macOS, Apple's desktop and server operating system. It superseded Mac OS X 10.0 and preceded Mac OS X Jaguar. Mac OS X 10.1 was released on September 25, 2001, as a free update for Mac OS X 10.0 users.

The operating system was handed out for free by Apple employees after Steve Jobs' keynote speech at the Seybold publishing conference in San Francisco. It was subsequently distributed to Mac users on October 25, 2001, at Apple Stores and other retail stores that carried Apple products.

Mac OS X 10.1 was codenamed "Puma" because the internal team thought it was "one fast cat." In January 2002, Apple switched to using Mac OS X as the default OS on all new Macs at the time starting with the 10.1.2 release, replacing Mac OS 9.

== Features ==
Apple introduced many features that were missing from the previous version, as well as improving overall system performance.

This system release brought some major new features to the Mac OS X platform:

- Performance enhancements — Mac OS X 10.1 introduced large performance increases throughout the system.
- Easier CD and DVD burning — better support in Finder as well as in iTunes
- DVD playback support — DVDs can be played in Apple DVD Player
- More printer support (200 printers supported out of the box) — One of the main complaints of version 10.0 users was the lack of printer drivers, and Apple attempted to remedy the situation by including more drivers, although many critics complained that there were still not enough.
- Faster 3D (OpenGL performs 20% faster) — The OpenGL drivers and handling were vastly improved in this version of Mac OS X, which created a large performance gap for 3D elements in the interface, and 3D applications.
- Improved AppleScript — The scripting interface now allows scripting access to many more system components, such as the Printer Center, and Terminal, thus improving the customizability of the interface. As well, Apple introduced AppleScript Studio, which allows a user to create full AppleScript applications in a simple graphical interface.
- Improved filehandling - The Finder was enhanced to optionally hide file extensions on a per-file basis. The Cocoa API was enhanced to allow developers to set traditional Mac type and creator information directly without relying on Carbon to do it.
- ColorSync 4.0, the color management system and API.
- Image Capture, for acquiring images from digital cameras and scanners.
- Menu Extras, a set of items the user can add to the system menu, replacing the supplied Dock Extras from Mac OS X 10.0 Cheetah.

=== Applications found on Mac OS X 10.1 Puma ===
- Address Book
- AppleScript
- Calculator
- Chess
- Clock
- CPU Monitor
- DVD Player
- Image Capture
- iMovie
- Internet Connect
- Internet Explorer for Mac
- iTunes
- Mail
- Preview
- Process Viewer (now Activity Monitor)
- QuickTime Player
- Sherlock
- Stickies
- System Preferences
- StuffIt Expander
- TextEdit
- Terminal

== System requirements ==
Supported computers:

- Power Mac G3
- Power Mac G4
- Power Mac G4 Cube
- iMac G3
- iMac G4,
- eMac,
- PowerBook G3, except for the original PowerBook G3
- PowerBook G4
- iBook

RAM:

- 128 megabytes (MB) (unofficially 64 MB minimum)

Hard Drive Space:

- 1.5 gigabytes (GB)

== Release history ==
Version	Build	Date	Darwin version	Notes
10.1	5G64	September 25, 2001	1.4.1	Original retail CD-ROM release; 5L14 and 5L17b available after certain security updates
10.1.1	5M28	November 12, 2001	5.1	
10.1.2	5P48	December 21, 2001	5.2	
10.1.3	5Q45	February 19, 2002	5.3	
10.1.4	5Q125	April 17, 2002	5.4	
10.1.5	5S60	June 5, 2002	5.5	

== Timeline ==
Timeline of Mac operating systems

Preceded by Mac OS X 10.0 (Cheetah)	Mac OS X 10.1 (Puma); 2001	Succeeded by Mac OS X 10.2 (Jaguar)
