= Apple T2 =

System-on-a-chip designed by Apple Inc

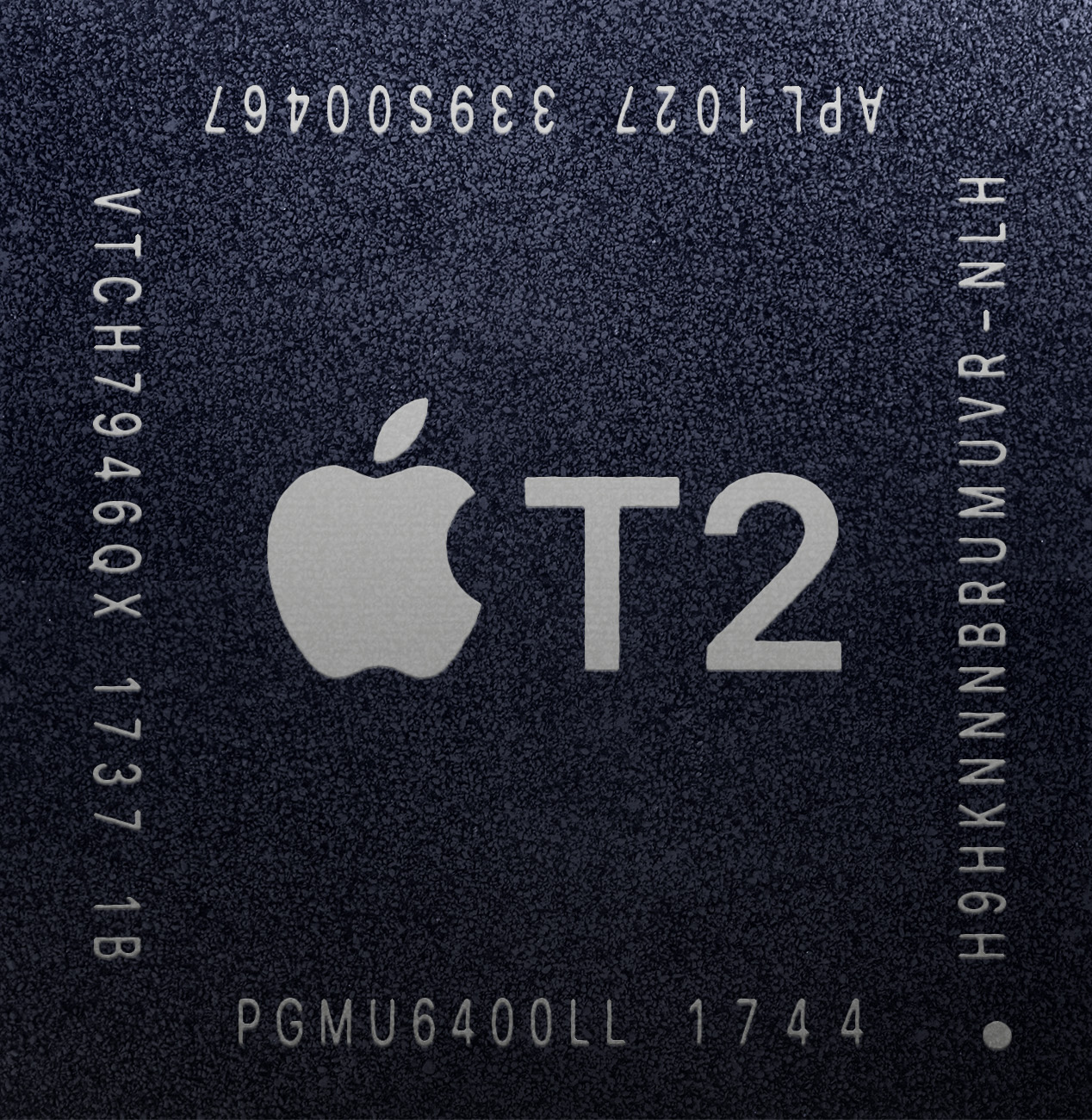

General information
- Launched: December 14, 2017
- Discontinued: June 5, 2023
- Designed by: Apple Inc.
- Common manufacturer: TSMC
- Product code: APL1027

Physical specifications
- Cores: 4 (2× Hurricane + 2× Zephyr)

Cache
- L1 cache: Per core: 126 KB instruction + 126 KB data
- L2 cache: 3 MB shared

Architecture and classification
- Application: Security, Controller
- Technology node: 16 nm
- Microarchitecture: ARMv8: "Hurricane"/"Zephyr"; ARMv7: Cortex-A7
- Instruction set: ARMv8.1-A: A64, A32, T32; ARMv7-A: A32

Products, models, variants
- Variant: Apple A10

History
- Predecessor: Apple T1

The Apple T2 (Apple's internal name is T8012) is an ARM system on a chip (SoC) tasked with providing security and controller features to Apple's Intel-based Macintosh computers. It is a 64-bit ARMv8 SoC and runs bridgeOS. T2 has its own RAM and is essentially a special embedded controller of its own, running in parallel to and responding to requests by the main computer that the user interacts with.

== Design ==
The main application processor in T2 is a variant of the Apple A10, which is a 64-bit ARMv8.1-A based CPU. It is manufactured by TSMC on their 16 nm process, just as the A10. Analysis of the die reveals a nearly identical CPU macro as the A10 which reveals a four core design for its main application processor, with two large high performance cores, "Hurricane", and two smaller efficiency cores, "Zephyr". Analysis also reveals the same amount of RAM controllers, but a much reduced GPU facility; three blocks, only a quarter the size compared to A10.

The die measures 9.6 mm × 10.8 mm, a die size of 104 mm^{2}, which amounts to about 80% of the size of the A10.

It serves as a co-processor to its Intel based host, providing of facilities for handling a variety of functions not present in the host. It is designed to stay active even if the main computer is in a halted low power mode. The main application processor in T2 is running an operating system called bridgeOS.

The secondary processor in T2 is an 32-bit ARMv7-A based CPU called Secure Enclave Processor (SEP) which has the task of generating and storing encryption keys. It is running an operating system called "sepOS" based on the L4 microkernel.

The T2 module is built as a package on a package (PoP) together with its own LP-DDR4 RAM. Mac configurations with 1 TB of SSD storage or greater receive 2 GB LP-DDR4, while lower storage configurations receive 1 GB.

The bridgeOS of Apple T2 is stored in a firmware partition of the Mac's built-in SSD, which is hidden in macOS and Windows.

The T2 communicates with the host via a USB-attached Ethernet port.

=== Security features ===
There are numerous features regarding security, including:

- The SEP is used for handling and storing encryption keys, including keys for Touch ID, FileVault, macOS Keychain, and UEFI firmware passwords. It also stores the machine's unique ID (UID) and group ID (GID).
- An AES Crypto Engine implementing AES-256 and a hardware random number generator.
- A Public Key Accelerator is used to perform asymmetric cryptography operations like RSA and elliptic-curve cryptography.
- A storage controller for the computer's solid-state drive, including always on, on-the-fly encryption and decryption of data to and from it.

The T2 is integral in the boot sequence and upgrading of operating systems, not allowing unsigned components to interfere.

=== Other features ===
There are other facilities present not directly associated with security.

- Controllers for microphones, camera, ambient light sensors and Touch ID.
- Image coprocessor enabling accelerated image processing and quality enhancements such as color, exposure balance, and focus for the iMac Pro's FaceTime HD camera.
- Video encoder enabling accelerated encoding of H.264 and H.265.
- Controller for a touchscreen, implemented as the Touch Bar in portable Macintosh computers.
- Speech recognition used in the "Hey Siri" feature.
- Monitoring and controlling of the machine state, including a system diagnose server and thermals management.
- Speaker controller.

== History ==
The Apple T2 was first released in the iMac Pro in late 2017.

On July 12, 2018, Apple released an updated MacBook Pro that includes the T2 chip, which among other things enables the "Hey Siri" feature.

On November 7, 2018, Apple released the updated Mac Mini and MacBook Air models with the T2 chip.

On August 4, 2020, a refresh of the 5K iMac was announced, including the T2 chip.

The functionality of the T2 chip is incorporated in Apple's M-series CPUs, thus eliminating the need for a separate chip in Apple silicon-powered computers. The T2 chip was discontinued with the completion of the Mac transition to Apple silicon in June 2023.

== Security vulnerabilities ==
In October 2019 security researchers began to theorize that the T2 might also be affected by the checkm8 bug as it was roughly based on the A10 design from 2016 in the original iMac Pro. Rick Mark then ported libimobiledevice to work with the Apple T2 providing a free and open source solution to restoring the T2 outside of Apple Configurator and enabling further work on the T2. On March 6, 2020, a team of engineers dubbed T2 Development Team exploited the existing checkm8 bug in the T2 and released the hash of a dump of the secure ROM as a proof of entry. The checkra1n team quickly integrated the patches required to support jailbreaking the T2.

The T2 Development Team then used Apple's undocumented vendor-defined messages over USB power delivery to be able to put a T2 device into Device Firmware Upgrade mode without user interaction. This compounded the issue since it was now possible for a T2 to be jailbroken simply by plugging it into a maliciously customised charging device.

Later in the year the release of the blackbird SEP vulnerability further compounded the impact of the defect by allowing arbitrary code execution in the T2 Secure Enclave Processor. This had the impact of potentially affecting encrypted credentials such as the FileVault keys as well as other secure Apple Keychain items.

Developer Rick Mark then determined that macOS could be installed over the same iDevice recovery protocols, which later ended up true of the M1 series of Apple Macs. On September 10, 2020, a public release of checkra1n was published that allowed users to jailbreak the T2. The T2 Development Team created patches to remove signature validation from files on the T2 such as the MacEFI as well as the boot sound. Members of the T2 Development Team begin answering questions in industry Slack instances. A member of the security community from IronPeak used this data to compile an impact analysis of the defect, which was later corrected to correctly attribute the original researchers. The original researchers made multiple corrections to the press that covered the IronPeak blog.

In October 2020, a hardware flaw in the chip's security features was found that might be exploited in a way that cannot be patched, using a similar method as the jailbreaking of the iPhone with A10 chip, since the T2 chip is based on the A10 chip. Apple was notified of this vulnerability but did not respond before security researchers publicly disclosed the vulnerability. It was later demonstrated that this vulnerability can allow users to implement custom Mac startup sounds.

== Products with the T2 chip ==
- iMac Pro
- MacBook Pro (13-inch, 2018, Four Thunderbolt 3 ports)
- MacBook Pro (15-inch, 2018)
- Mac mini (2018)
- MacBook Air (2018)
- MacBook Pro (13-inch, 2019)
- MacBook Pro (15-inch, 2019)
- MacBook Air (2019)
- MacBook Pro (16-inch, 2019)
- Mac Pro (2019)
- MacBook Pro (13-inch, Early 2020)
- MacBook Air (Early 2020)
- iMac (27-inch, 2020)

== See also ==
- Apple silicon, range of ARM-based processors designed by Apple for their products
- Apple A10
- bridgeOS
- Secure cryptoprocessor
