= MacOS Catalina =

2019 operating system version

macOS Catalina
- Version of the macOS operating system

- Screenshot of the macOS Catalina desktop in dark mode
- Developer: Apple
- OS family: Macintosh; Unix
- Working state: No longer supported
- Source model: Closed, with open source components
- General availability: October 7, 2019; 7 years ago
- Latest release: 10.15.8 Security Update 2026-001 (19H2036) (February 2, 2026; 9 months ago) [±]
- Update method: Software Update
- Supported platforms: x86-64
- Kernel type: Hybrid (XNU)
- License: APSL and Apple EULA
- Preceded by: macOS Mojave
- Succeeded by: macOS Big Sur
- Official website: MacOS Catalina (archived at Wayback Machine)
- Tagline: The power of Mac. Taken further.

Support status
- Unsupported as of February 2, 2026. Finder is still able to download driver updates to sync to newer devices.

macOS Catalina (version 10.15) is the sixteenth major release of macOS, Apple's desktop operating system for Macintosh computers. It is the successor to macOS Mojave and was announced at WWDC 2019 on June 3, 2019, and released to the public on October 7, 2019. Catalina is the first version of macOS to support only 64-bit applications and the first to include Activation Lock. It is also the last version of macOS to have the major version number be 10.x; its successor, Big Sur, released on November 12, 2020, is version 11. In order to increase web compatibility, various web browsers, such as Safari, Chromium, and Firefox, still inform websites that they are running on Catalina version 10.15.7, regardless of the actual macOS version in use.

The operating system is named after Santa Catalina Island, which is located off the coast of southern California.

macOS Catalina is the final version of macOS that supports the Unibody MacBook Pro, as its successor, macOS Big Sur, drops support for its mid-2012 and final model.

== System requirements ==
All standard configuration Macs that supported macOS Mojave support macOS Catalina. Mac Pros released from 2010 to 2012, which could run Mojave only with a GPU upgrade, are not supported. Catalina requires 4 GB of memory, an increase over the 2 GB required by Lion through Mojave.

- iMac (late 2012 or later)
- iMac Pro (2017)
- MacBook (early 2015 or later)
- MacBook Air (mid 2012 or later)
- MacBook Pro (mid 2012 or later)
- Mac Mini (late 2012 or later)
- Mac Pro (late 2013 or later)

It is unofficially possible to install macOS Catalina on many older Macintosh computers that are not officially supported by Apple. This requires using a patch to modify the install image.

== Changes ==
=== System ===
==== Catalyst ====
Catalyst is a software-development tool that allows developers to write apps that can run on macOS, iOS and iPadOS. Apple demonstrated several ported apps, including Jira and Twitter (after the latter discontinued its macOS app in February 2018).

==== System extensions ====
An upgrade from Kexts. System extensions avoid the problems of Kexts. There are 3 kinds of System extensions: Network Extensions, Endpoint Security Extensions, and Driver Extensions. System extensions run in userspace, outside of the kernel. Catalina will be the last version of macOS to support legacy system extensions.

==== DriverKit ====
A replacement for IOKit device drivers, driver extensions are built using DriverKit. DriverKit is a new SDK with all-new frameworks based on IOKit, but updated and modernized. It is designed for building device drivers in userspace, outside of the kernel.

==== Gatekeeper ====
Mac apps, installer packages, and kernel extensions that are signed with a Developer ID must be notarized by Apple to run on macOS Catalina.

==== Activation Lock ====
Activation Lock prevents the unauthorized use and drive erasure of devices with an Apple T2 security chip (2018, 2019, and 2020 MacBook Pro; 2020 5K iMac; 2018 MacBook Air, iMac Pro; 2018 Mac Mini; 2019 Mac Pro).

==== Dedicated system volume ====
The system runs on its own read-only volume, separate from all other data on the Mac.

==== Voice control ====
Users can give detailed voice commands to applications. On-device machine processing is used to offer better navigation.

==== Sidecar ====
Sidecar allows a Mac to use an iPad (running iPadOS) as a wireless external display. With Apple Pencil, the device can also be used as a graphics tablet for software running on the computer. Sidecar requires a Mac with Intel Skylake CPUs and newer (such as the fourth-generation MacBook Pro), and an iPad that supports Apple Pencil.

==== Support for wireless game controllers ====
The Game Controller framework adds support for two major console game controllers: the PlayStation 4's DualShock 4 and the Xbox One controller.

==== Time Machine ====
A number of under-the-hood changes were made to Time Machine, macOS's backup software. One change was the manner in which backup data is stored on network-attached devices was changed, and this change is not backwards-compatible with earlier versions of macOS. Apple declined to document these changes, but some of them have been noted.

==== Pro Display XDR ====
macOS Catalina 10.15.2 adds compatibility with the Pro Display XDR and enables 6016×3384 output on the 2019 iMac and 2018 15-inch MacBook Pro.

=== Applications ===
==== iTunes ====
iTunes is replaced by separate Music, Podcasts, TV and Books apps, in line with iOS. iOS device management is now conducted via Finder. The TV app on Mac supports Dolby Atmos, Dolby Vision, and HDR10 on MacBooks released in 2018 or later, while 4K HDR playback is supported on Macs released in 2018 or later when connected to a compatible display.

==== Find My ====
Find My Mac and the Find My Friends widget were merged into Find My.

==== Notes ====
The Notes application was enhanced to allow better management of checklists and the ability to share folders with other users. The application version was incremented from 4.6 (in macOS 10.14 Mojave) to 4.7.

==== Reminders ====
Among other visual and functional overhauls, attachments can be added to reminders and Siri can intelligently estimate when to remind the user about an event.

==== Voice Memos ====
The Voice Memos application, first ported from iOS to the Mac in macOS 10.14 Mojave as version 2.0, was incremented to version 2.1.

==== Removed or changed components ====
- macOS Catalina exclusively supports 64-bit applications. 32-bit applications no longer run (including all software that utilizes the Carbon API as well as QuickTime 7 applications, image, audio and video codecs). Apple has also removed all 32-bit-only apps from the Mac App Store.
- Z shell (executable "zsh") is the default login shell and interactive shell in macOS Catalina, replacing Bash, the default shell since Mac OS X Panther in 2003. Bash continues to be available in macOS Catalina, along with other shells such as csh/tcsh and ksh.
- Dashboard has been removed.
- The ability to add backgrounds in Photo Booth has been removed.
- The command-line interface GNU Emacs application has been removed.
- Built-in support for Perl, Python 2.7 and Ruby are included in macOS for compatibility with legacy software. Future versions of macOS will not include scripting language runtimes by default, possibly requiring users to install additional packages.
- AirDrop only supports the redesigned protocol introduced with OS X Yosemite for Macs released in 2012 or later, and no longer functions with the legacy AirDrop on Macs running Mac OS X Lion, Mountain Lion and Mavericks, or models released before 2012.
- Support for legacy Safari extensions such as uBlock Origin, and WebSQL has been removed in Safari 13.
- Circular app icons now have outlines matching their main color.
- Read access for the HFS file system is no longer supported.

== Security ==
Ars Technica reported that macOS Catalina contained a critical privilege escalation vulnerability, which resulted in a backdoor being installed if users visited a Hong Kong pro-democracy website. The vulnerability was reported to Apple in August 2021 and patched in a Catalina update in September, but it had already been patched by Apple in macOS Big Sur 11.2, released 234 days earlier on February 1. Security experts have criticized Apple for not patching critical known vulnerabilities in older versions and for not being transparent about older versions only receiving some, but not all, security patches. The latest major release of Apple's operating systems (macOS, iOS, and others) receive all security updates.

== Reception ==
Catalina received favorable reviews on release for some of its features. However, some critics found the OS version distinctly less reliable than earlier versions. The broad addition of user-facing security measures (somewhat analogous to the addition of User Account Control dialog boxes with Windows Vista a decade earlier) was criticized as intrusive and annoying.

== Release history ==
Version	Build	Date	Darwin version	Release Notes	Standalone download
10.15	19A583	October 7, 2019	19.0.0	Original Software Update release Security content	
10.15	19A602	October 15, 2019	19.0.0	Supplemental update	
10.15	19A603	October 21, 2019	19.0.0	Revised Supplemental update	
10.15.1	19B88	October 29, 2019	19.0.0 xnu-6153.41.3~29	About the macOS Catalina 10.15.1 Update Security content	macOS 10.15.1 Update
10.15.2	19C57	December 10, 2019	19.2.0 xnu-6153.61.1~20	About the macOS Catalina 10.15.2 Update Security content	macOS 10.15.2 Update macOS 10.15.2 Combo Update
10.15.2	19C58	December 10, 2019	19.2.0 xnu-6153.61.1~20	About the macOS Catalina 10.15.2 Update Security content	macOS 10.15.2 Update macOS 10.15.2 Combo Update
10.15.3	19D76	January 28, 2020	19.3.0 xnu-6153.81.5~1	About the macOS Catalina 10.15.3 Update Security content	macOS 10.15.3 Update macOS 10.15.3 Combo Update
10.15.4	19E266	March 24, 2020	19.4.0 xnu-6153.101.6~15	About the macOS Catalina 10.15.4 Update Security content	macOS 10.15.4 Update macOS 10.15.4 Combo Update
10.15.4	19E287	April 8, 2020	19.4.0 xnu-6153.101.6~15	Supplemental update	macOS 10.15.4 Supplemental Update
10.15.5	19F96	May 26, 2020	19.5.0 xnu-6153.121.1~7	About the macOS Catalina 10.15.5 Update Security content	macOS 10.15.5 Update macOS 10.15.5 Combo Update
10.15.5	19F101	June 1, 2020	19.5.0 xnu-6153.121.2~2	Supplemental update Security content	macOS 10.15.5 Supplemental Update
10.15.6	19G73	July 15, 2020	19.6.0 xnu-6153.141.1~9 Jul 5 00:43:10 PDT 2020	About the macOS Catalina 10.15.6 Update Security content	macOS 10.15.6 Update macOS 10.15.6 Combo Update
10.15.6	19G2021	August 12, 2020	19.6.0 xnu-6153.141.1~1 Jun 18 20:49:00 PDT 2020	Supplemental update	macOS 10.15.6 Supplemental Update
10.15.7	19H2	September 24, 2020	19.6.0 xnu-6153.141.2~1 Mon Aug 31 22:12:52 PDT 2020	About the macOS Catalina 10.15.7 Update Security content	macOS 10.15.7 Update macOS 10.15.7 Combo Update
10.15.7	19H4	October 27, 2020	19.6.0 xnu-6153.141.2~1 Mon Aug 31 22:12:52 PDT 2020	About the macOS Catalina 10.15.7 Update Security content	macOS 10.15.7 Update macOS 10.15.7 Combo Update
10.15.7	19H15	November 5, 2020	19.6.0 xnu-6153.141.2.2~1 Thu Oct 29 22:56:45 PDT 2020	Supplemental update Security content	macOS 10.15.7 Supplemental Update macOS 10.15.7 Supplemental Update (Combo)
10.15.7	19H114	December 14, 2020	19.6.0 xnu-6153.141.10~1 Tue Nov 10 00:10:30 PST 2020	About the security content of Security Update 2020-001	Security Update 2020-001 (Catalina)
10.15.7	19H512	February 1, 2021	19.6.0 xnu-6153.141.16~1 Tue Jan 12 22:13:05 PST 2021	About the security content of Security Update 2021-001	Security Update 2021-001 (Catalina)
10.15.7	19H524	February 9, 2021	19.6.0 xnu-6153.141.16~1 Tue Jan 12 22:13:05 PST 2021	Supplemental Update Security content	macOS Catalina 10.15.7 Supplemental Update 2
10.15.7	19H1030	April 26, 2021	19.6.0 xnu-6153.141.28.1~1 Mon Apr 12 20:57:45 PDT 2021	About the security content of Security Update 2021-002	Security Update 2021-002 (Catalina)
10.15.7	19H1217	May 24, 2021	19.6.0 xnu-6153.141.33~1 Thu May 6 00:48:39 PDT 2021	About the security content of Security Update 2021-003	Security Update 2021-003 (Catalina)
10.15.7	19H1323	July 21, 2021	19.6.0 xnu-6153.141.35~1 Thu Jun 22 19:49:55 PDT 2021	About the security content of Security Update 2021-004	Security Update 2021-004 (Catalina)
10.15.7	19H1417	September 13, 2021	19.6.0 xnu-6153.141.40~1 Tue Aug 24 20:28:00 PDT 2021	About the security content of Security Update 2021-005	Security Update 2021-005 (Catalina)
10.15.7	19H1419	September 23, 2021	19.6.0 xnu-6153.141.40.1~1 Thu Sep 16 20:58:47 PDT 2021	About the security content of Security Update 2021-006	Security Update 2021-006 (Catalina)
10.15.7	19H1519	October 25, 2021	19.6.0 xnu-6153.141.43~1 Tue Oct 12 18:34:05 PDT 2021	About the security content of Security Update 2021-007	Security Update 2021-007 (Catalina)
10.15.7	19H1615	December 13, 2021	19.6.0 xnu-6153.141.50~1 Sun Nov 14 19:58:51 PST 2021	About the security content of Security Update 2021-008	Security Update 2021-008 (Catalina)
10.15.7	19H1713	January 26, 2022	19.6.0 xnu-6153.141.51~3 Thu Jan 13 01:26:33 PST 2022	About the security content of Security Update 2022-001	Security Update 2022-001 (Catalina)
10.15.7	19H1715	February 14, 2022	19.6.0 xnu-6153.141.51~3 Thu Jan 13 01:26:33 PST 2022	Security Update 2022-002	Security Update 2022-002 (Catalina)
10.15.7	19H1824	March 14, 2022	19.6.0 xnu-6153.141.59~1 Tue Feb 15 21:39:11 PST 2022	About the security content of Security Update 2022-003	Security Update 2022-003 (Catalina)
10.15.7	19H1922	May 16, 2022	19.6.0 xnu-6153.141.62~1 Mon Apr 18 21:50:40 PDT 2022	About the security content of Security Update 2022-004	Security Update 2022-004 (Catalina)
10.15.7	19H2026	July 20, 2022	19.6.0 xnu-6153.141.66~1 Tue Jun 21 21:18:39 PDT 2022	About the security content of Security Update 2022-005	Security Update 2022-005 (Catalina)
10.15.8	19H2036	February 2, 2026	19.6.0 xnu-6153.141.66~1 Tue Jun 21 21:18:39 PDT 2022	Apple security releases	

Preceded by macOS 10.14 (Mojave)	macOS 10.15 (Catalina); 2019	Succeeded by macOS 11 (Big Sur)
