= APSL =

APSL can refer to:

- Apple Public Source License
- American Premier Soccer League
- American Professional Soccer League
- Above Present Sea Level
