= Mac OS X Jaguar =

2002 operating system version

Mac OS X 10.2 Jaguar
- Version of the macOS operating system

- Screenshot of Mac OS X 10.2 Jaguar
- Developer: Apple Computer, Inc.
- OS family: Macintosh; Unix-like
- Working state: No longer supported
- Source model: Closed, with open source components
- General availability: August 23, 2002; 24 years ago
- Latest release: 10.2.8 / October 3, 2003; 23 years ago
- Supported platforms: PowerPC
- Kernel type: Hybrid (XNU)
- License: Apple Public Source License (APSL) and Apple end-user license agreement (EULA)
- Preceded by: Mac OS X 10.1
- Succeeded by: Mac OS X 10.3 Panther
- Official website: Mac OS X Jaguar (archived at Wayback Machine)
- Tagline: Wildly innovative.

Support status
- Historical, unsupported as of January 1, 2007

Mac OS X Jaguar (version 10.2) is the third major release of macOS, Apple's desktop and server operating system. It superseded Mac OS X 10.1 and preceded Mac OS X Panther. The operating system was released on August 23, 2002. It was available both for single-computer installations and in a "family pack" that allowed five installations on separate computers in one household. Jaguar was the first Mac OS X release to publicly use its code name in marketing and advertisements.

== System requirements ==
Mac OS X Jaguar requires a PowerPC G3 or G4 CPU and 128 MB of RAM. Special builds were released for the first PowerPC G5 systems released by Apple.

== New and changed features ==
- MPEG-4 support is added in QuickTime.
- Address Book was significantly improved.
- Inkwell was introduced for handwriting recognition.
- New features are introduced, such as Zeroconf and Rendezvous (later renamed to Bonjour), which allows devices on the same network to automatically discover each other and offer available services, such as file sharing, shared scanners, and printers, to the user.
- Mac OS X Jaguar Server 10.2.2 added journaling to HFS Plus, the native Macintosh file system, to add increased reliability and data recovery features. This was later added to the standard Mac OS X in version 10.3 Panther.
- Jaguar saw the debut of Quartz Extreme, a technology used to composite graphics directly on the video card, without the use of software to composite windows. The technology allotted the task of drawing the 3D surface of windows to the video card, rather than to the CPU, to increase interface responsiveness and performance.
- Universal Access was added to allow the Macintosh to be usable by disabled computer users.
- The user interface of Jaguar was also updated to add search features to the Finder, powered by Sherlock 3.
- Internally, Jaguar added the Common Unix Printing System (also known as CUPS), a modular printing system for Unix-like operating systems, and improved support for Microsoft Windows networks using the open-source Samba as a server for the SMB remote file access protocol and a FreeBSD-derived virtual file system module as a client for SMB.
- The Happy Mac startup icon that was introduced with the original Macintosh was replaced with a grey Apple logo.

== Marketing ==
Jaguar was a $129 upgrade for both Mac OS 9 and existing Mac OS X users. In October 2002, Apple offered free copies of Jaguar to all U.S. K-12 teachers as part of the "X For Teachers" program. Teachers who wanted to get a copy had to fill out a form and a packet containing Mac OS X installation discs and manuals was then shipped to the school where they taught.

Jaguar was the first version of Mac OS X to use its internal codename as the official name of the operating system. To that effect, the retail packaging featured computer-generated jaguar fur designed by animation studio Pixar.

Starting with Jaguar, Mac OS X releases were given a feline-related marketing name upon announcement until the introduction of OS X Mavericks in June 2013, at which point releases began to be named after locations in California, where Apple is headquartered. Mac OS X (rebranded as OS X in 2011 and later macOS in 2016) releases are now also referred to by their marketing name, in addition to version numbers.

== Release history ==
Version	Build	Date	Darwin version	Notes
10.2	6C115	August 24, 2002	6.0	Original retail release
10.2	6C115a	August 24, 2002	6.0	Original retail release
10.2.1	6D52	September 18, 2002	6.1	
10.2.2	6F21	November 11, 2002	6.2	
10.2.3	6G30	December 19, 2002	6.3	
10.2.3	6G37		6.3	Updated retail release
10.2.3	6G50		6.3	Server edition; retail release
10.2.4	6I32	February 13, 2003	6.4	
10.2.5	6L29	April 10, 2003	6.5	
10.2.6	6L60	May 6, 2003	6.6	
10.2.7	6R65	September 22, 2003	6.7	Removed from distribution due to defects
10.2.8	6R73	October 3, 2003	6.8	
10.2.8	6S90	October 3, 2003	6.8	G5 only

Mac OS X 10.2.7 (codenames Blackrider, Smeagol) was only available to the then-new Power Mac G5s and aluminum PowerBook G4s released before Mac OS X Panther. It was never officially released to the general public.

Mac OS X 10.2.8 is the last version of Mac OS X officially supported on the "Beige G3" desktop, minitower, and all-in-one systems as well as the PowerBook G3 Series (1998) also known as Wallstreet/PDQ; though later releases can be run on such Macs with the help of unofficial, unlicensed, and unsupported third-party tools such as XPostFacto.

== Timeline ==
Timeline of Mac operating systems

Preceded by Mac OS X 10.1 (Puma)	Mac OS X 10.2 (Jaguar); 2002	Succeeded by Mac OS X 10.3 (Panther)
