= XDarwin =

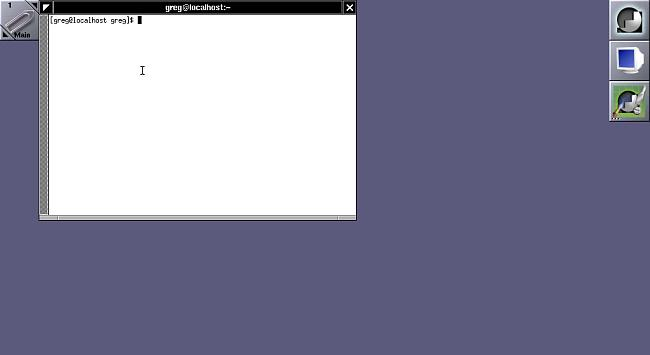
- Window Maker in XDarwin
- Developer: XonX
- Operating system: Mac OS X
- Type: Display server

XDarwin is an obsolete X Window System (X11) display server for the Darwin operating system and early versions of Mac OS X. XDarwin allows one to use programs written for X11 on those operating systems.

XDarwin was ported by the XonX project, an offshoot project created by XFree86 developers. It is integrated in the upstream source code of the XFree86 and Xorg servers, where it is maintained.

Originally, XDarwin required an X window manager to run. For this task, a window manager called OroborOSX was created; this was based on Oroborus, another X window manager, but modified to look like the native Mac OS window manager. More recent versions of XDarwin can also run in rootless mode, which is to say that it integrates with the native window manager instead of requiring such a program specifically for X.

Before the introduction of Apple's X11.app, XDarwin was the only X11 server available for OS X. According to the XonX project, X11.app itself contains code from XDarwin. Programs such as OpenOffice.org use XDarwin to run in the X11 windowing environment, either in a rootless or full-screen mode. A version of the program was created for Mac OS X Panther or higher that runs in the native Aqua interface.
