= XQuartz =

Version of the X.Org X server for macOS

XQuartz (X11.app)
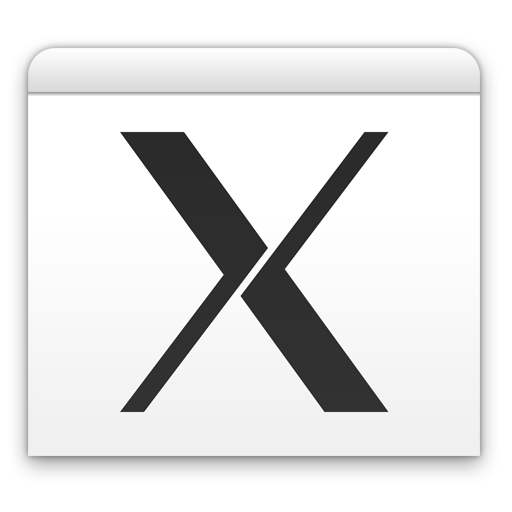
- Developers: Jeremy Huddleston Sequoia, X.Org Foundation, Apple Inc.
- Stable release: 2.8.6 / July 14, 2026; 4 months ago
- Written in: C
- Operating system: macOS
- Type: Display server
- License: Apple Public Source License; MIT License
- Website: www.xquartz.org
- Repository: github.com/XQuartz/XQuartz

XQuartz is an open-source version of the X.Org X server, a display server for the X Window System (sometimes shortened to X11 or X) that runs on macOS. In 2012, it formally replaced Apple's internal X11 app for OS X Mountain Lion (version 10.8). The name "XQuartz" derives from Quartz, part of the macOS Core Graphics framework, to which XQuartz connects these applications. XQuartz allows cross-platform applications using X11 for the GUI to run on macOS, many of which are not specifically designed for macOS. This includes numerous scientific and academic software projects.

== History ==
X11.app was initially available as a downloadable public beta for Mac OS X 10.2 Jaguar and later included as a standard package for Mac OS X 10.3 Panther. In Mac OS X 10.4 Tiger X11.app was an optional install included on the install DVD. Mac OS X 10.5 Leopard, Mac OS X 10.6 Snow Leopard, and Mac OS X 10.7 Lion installed X11.app by default, but from OS X 10.8 Mountain Lion on Apple dropped dedicated support for X11.app, with users being directed to the open source XQuartz project (to which Apple contributes) instead.

In Mac OS X 10.4 Tiger, Apple's X11 implemented X11 protocol release 6.6 (X11R6.6). This implementation includes an XFree86 4.4 based X11 window server, Quartz rootless window manager, libraries, and basic utilities such as xterm. "Rootless" means that X window applications show up on the Quartz desktop, appearing like any other windowed Quartz application (that is, not in a virtual desktop contained within another window). In Mac OS X Leopard, X11 was updated to use X.Org Server (X11R7.2) rather than XFree86. The source code for X11 is available from Apple. Some source code is available under the Apple Public Source License while the bulk is licensed under the MIT License.

== Current version ==
The current version of XQuartz is a DDX (Device Dependent X) included in the X.Org Server and implements support for hardware-accelerated 2D graphics (in versions prior to 2.1), hardware OpenGL acceleration and integration with Aqua, the macOS graphical user interface (GUI). As of version 2.8.0, XQuartz does not provide support for high-resolution Retina displays to X11 apps, which run in pixel-doubled mode on high-resolution displays.

== List of versions (since 2010) ==
Version	macOS Requirement	Most important changes	Release date
XQuartz 2.8.6	Mac OS X High Sierra 10.13 or later	Addressed a longstanding issue with alpha blending ("black surfaces") that impacted Apple Silicon Macs.	2026-07-14
XQuartz 2.8.5	Mac OS X Mavericks 10.9 or later		2023-01-26
XQuartz 2.8.4	Mac OS X Mavericks 10.9 or later		2022-12-24
XQuartz 2.8.3	Mac OS X Mavericks 10.9 or later		2022-12-09
XQuartz 2.8.2	Mac OS X Mavericks 10.9 or later		2022-06-30
XQuartz 2.8.1	Mac OS X Mavericks 10.9 or later		2021-04-25
XQuartz 2.8.0	Mac OS X Mavericks 10.9 or later	Native support for Apple M1 Macs.	2021-03-21
XQuartz 2.7.11	Mac OS X Snow Leopard 10.6.3 or later	Last release supported on Mac OS X Snow Leopard	2016-10-29
XQuartz 2.7.10	Mac OS X Snow Leopard 10.6.3 or later		2016-10-22
XQuartz 2.7.9	Mac OS X Snow Leopard 10.6.3 or later		2016-05-05
XQuartz 2.7.8	Mac OS X Snow Leopard 10.6.3 or later	First release supported on OS X El Capitan	2015-10-17
XQuartz 2.7.7	Mac OS X Snow Leopard 10.6.3 or later	First release supported on OS X Yosemite	2014-08-18
XQuartz 2.7.6	Mac OS X Snow Leopard 10.6.3 or later		2014-05-17
XQuartz 2.7.5	Mac OS X Snow Leopard 10.6.3 or later	First release supported on OS X Mavericks	2013-11-10
XQuartz 2.7.4	Mac OS X Snow Leopard 10.6.3 or later		2012-09-27
XQuartz 2.7.3	Mac OS X Snow Leopard 10.6.3 or later		2012-08-27
XQuartz 2.7.2	Mac OS X Snow Leopard 10.6.3 or later	First release supported on OS X Mountain Lion	2012-06-01
XQuartz 2.7.1	Mac OS X Snow Leopard 10.6.3 or later		2012-06-01
XQuartz 2.7.0	Mac OS X Snow Leopard 10.6.3 or later	First release supported on Mac OS X 10.7 Lion	2011-11-04
XQuartz 2.6.3	Mac OS X Snow Leopard 10.6.3 or later		2011-07-20
XQuartz 2.6.2	Mac OS X Snow Leopard 10.6.3 or later		2011-04-30
XQuartz 2.6.1	Mac OS X Leopard 10.5.8, Mac OS X Snow Leopard 10.6.3, or later	Last release supported on Mac OS X Leopard	2011-03-17
XQuartz 2.6.0	Mac OS X Leopard 10.5.8, Mac OS X Snow Leopard 10.6.3, or later		2010-12-19
XQuartz 2.5.3	Mac OS X Leopard 10.5.8, Mac OS X Snow Leopard 10.6.3, or later		2010-08-13
XQuartz 2.5.2	Mac OS X Leopard 10.5.8, Mac OS X Snow Leopard 10.6.3, or later		2010-07-20
XQuartz 2.5.1	Mac OS X Leopard 10.5.8, Mac OS X Snow Leopard 10.6.3, or later		2010-07-10
XQuartz 2.5.0	Mac OS X Leopard 10.5.8, Mac OS X Snow Leopard 10.6.3, or later	First release supported on Mac OS X Snow Leopard	2010-03-29

== See also ==
- XWayland, to support X application under Wayland
- XDarwin, an implementation of X for macOS that preceded XQuartz, and supports versions of macOS before 10.3 unlike XQuartz
