= MacBook Air =

Line of ultraportable notebook computers by Apple

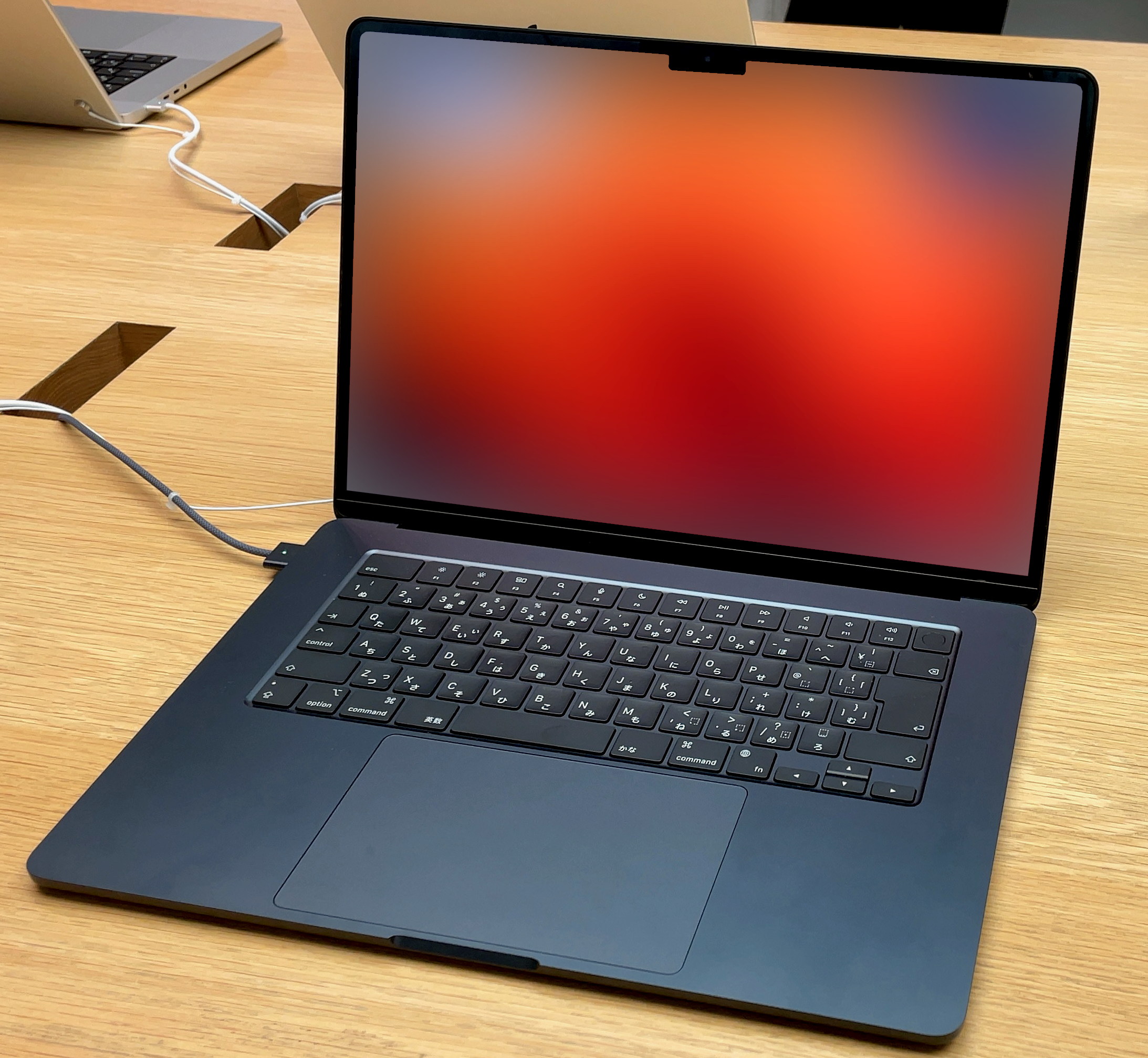
- MacBook Air (M2, 15-inch, 2023)
- Developer: Apple
- Product family: MacBook
- Type: Laptop
- Released: January 29, 2008; 18 years ago
- Operating system: macOS
- System on a chip: Apple M series
- CPU: Intel Core 2 Duo, i5, i7 (discontinued, 2008–2020)
- Marketing target: Consumer
- Related: 13-inch MacBook, 12-inch MacBook, MacBook Pro, MacBook Neo
- Website: apple.com/macbook-air

The MacBook Air is a line of consumer-oriented high-end notebook computers in the Mac series developed and manufactured by Apple since 2008. It features a thin, light structure in a machined aluminum case and either a 13 or 15 in (330 or 380 mm) screen. The MacBook Air's lower prices relative to the larger, higher performance MacBook Pro made it Apple's entry-level notebook for over a decade since the discontinuation of the original MacBook line in 2012, until the introduction of the MacBook Neo in 2026.

== Intel-based ==
=== Unibody (2008–2009) ===
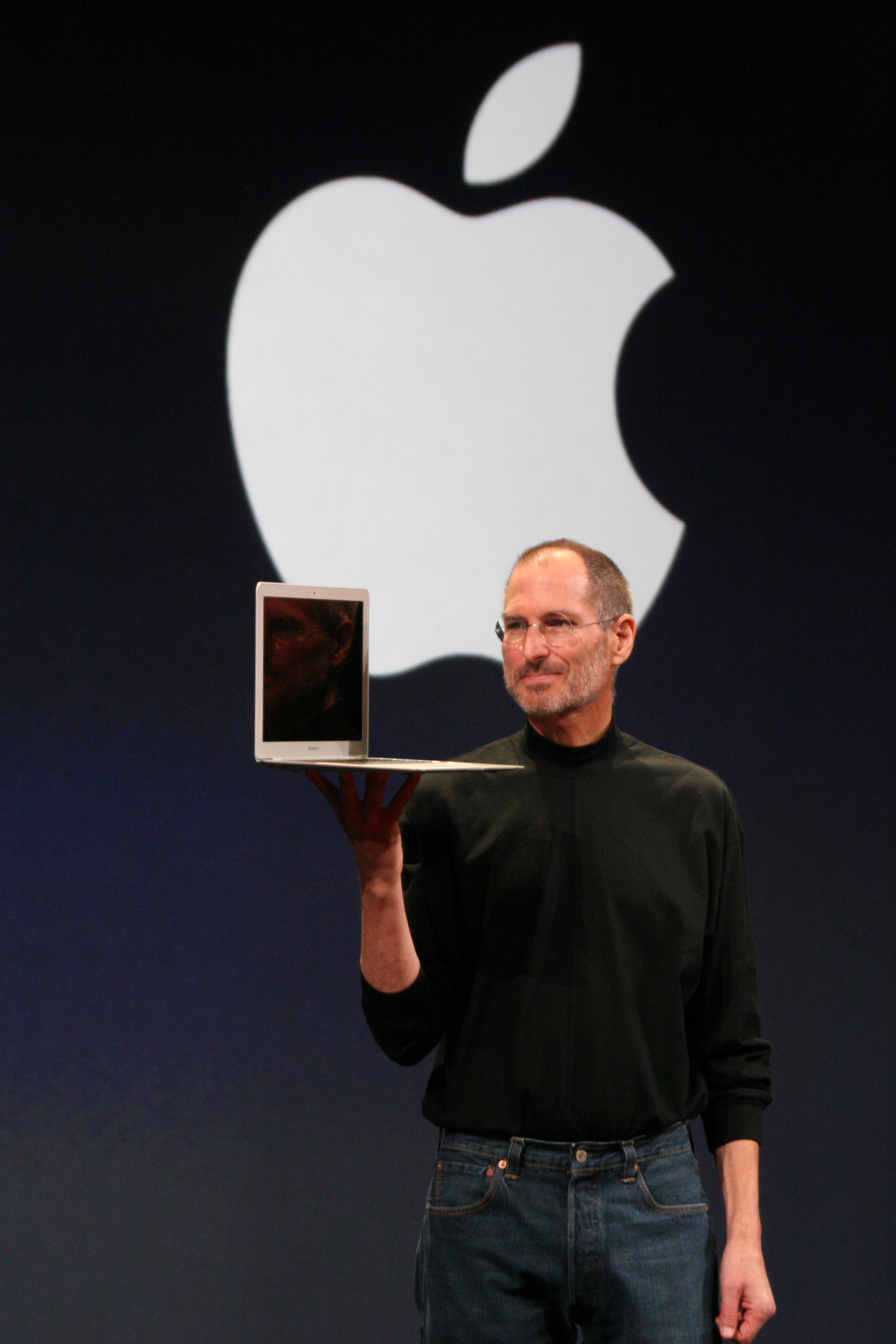
Steve Jobs showing the first MacBook Air at an Apple 2008 keynote address

Steve Jobs introduced the MacBook Air during Apple's keynote address at the 2008 Macworld conference on January 15, 2008.

The first MacBook Air had a 13.3-inch (340 mm) screen and was initially promoted as the world's thinnest notebook at 19 mm (0.75 in) (a previous record holder, 2005's Toshiba Portege R200, was 19.8 mm (0.78 in) thick). It featured a custom Intel Merom CPU and Intel GMA GPU which were 40% smaller than the standard chip package. It also featured an anti-glare LED backlit TN 6-bit color panel display, a full-size keyboard, and a large trackpad that responded to multi-touch gestures such as pinching, swiping, and rotating.

The MacBook Air was the first subcompact notebook offered by Apple after the 12-inch (300 mm) PowerBook G4 discontinued in 2006. It was also Apple's first computer with an optional solid-state drive. It was the last Mac to use a PATA storage drive. To conserve space, it uses the 1.8 in (46 mm) drive used in the iPod Classic instead of the typical 2.5 in (64 mm) drive. It was Apple's first notebook since the PowerBook 2400c without a built-in removable media drive. To read optical disks, users could either purchase an external USB drive such as Apple's SuperDrive or use the bundled Remote Disc software to access the drive of another computer wirelessly that has the program installed. The MacBook Air also did not include a FireWire port, Ethernet port, line-in, or Kensington Security Slot, which were standard features in most other Apple notebooks at the time.

On October 14, 2008, a new model was announced with a low-voltage Penryn processor and Nvidia GeForce graphics. Storage capacity was increased to a 128 GB SSD or a 120 GB HDD, and the micro-DVI video port was replaced by the Mini DisplayPort. The disk drive was also changed from a PATA drive to the faster SATA drive.

The mid-2009 revision featured slightly higher battery capacity and a faster Penryn CPU.

=== Tapered Unibody (2010–2017) ===
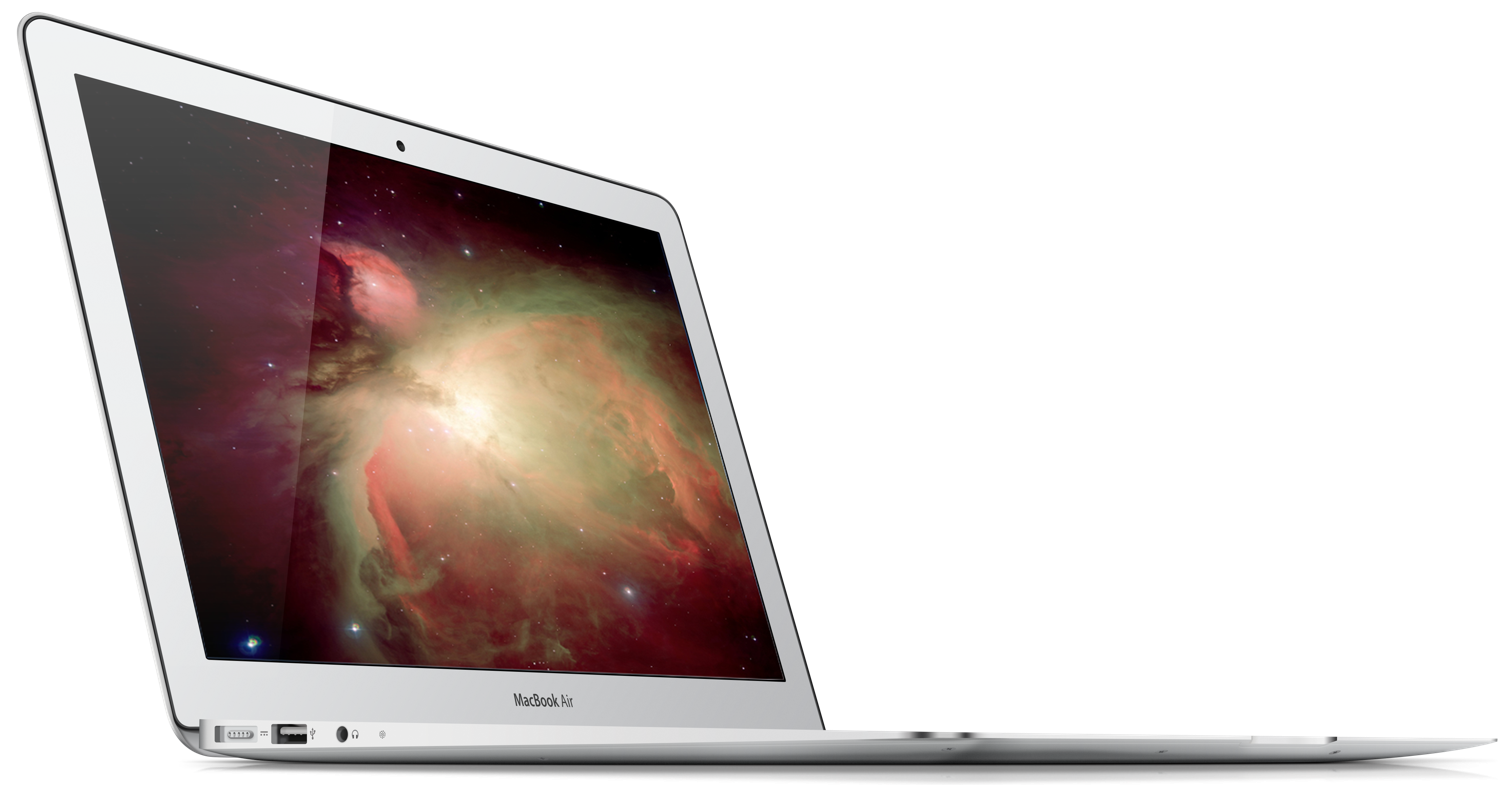
Left side of a MacBook Air (mid 2012). From left to right, MagSafe 2 power connector, USB port, headphone jack and built-in microphone.

On October 20, 2010, Apple released a redesigned 13 in (330 mm) model with a tapered enclosure, higher screen resolution, improved battery, a second USB port, stereo speakers, and standard solid state storage. A smaller model with an 11.6-inch (290 mm) screen was introduced, offering reduced cost, weight, battery life, and performance relative to the 13 in (330 mm) model, but better performance than typical netbooks of the time. Both 11 in (280 mm) and 13 in (330 mm) models had an analog audio output/headphone minijack supporting Apple earbuds with a microphone. The 13-inch model received a SDXC-capable SD Card slot. Solid-state storage was made standard, and later revisions added Intel Core i5 or i7 processors and Thunderbolt.

On July 20, 2011, Apple released updated models, which also became Apple's entry-level notebooks due to lowered prices and the discontinuation of the white MacBook around the same time. The mid-2011 models were upgraded with Sandy Bridge dual-core Intel Core i5 and i7 processors, Intel HD Graphics 3000, backlit keyboards, Thunderbolt, and Bluetooth was upgraded to v4.0. Maximum storage options were increased up to 256 GB. This revision also replaced the Expose (F3) key with a Mission Control key, and the Dashboard (F4) key with a Launchpad key.

On June 11, 2012, Apple updated the line with Intel Ivy Bridge dual-core Core i5 and i7 processors, HD Graphics 4000, faster memory and flash storage speeds, USB 3.0, an upgraded 720p FaceTime camera, and a thinner MagSafe 2 charging port. The standard memory was upgraded to 4 GB, with a maximum configuration of 8 GB.

On June 10, 2013, Apple updated the line with Haswell processors, Intel HD Graphics 5000, and 802.11ac Wi-Fi. Storage started at 128 GB SSD, with options for 256 GB and 512 GB. The Haswell processors considerably improved battery life from the previous generation, and the models were capable of 9 hours on the 11 in (280 mm) and 12 hours on the 13 in (330 mm) model; a team of reviewers exceeded expected battery life ratings during their test.

In March 2015, the models were refreshed with Broadwell processors, Intel HD Graphics 6000, Thunderbolt 2, and faster storage and memory.

The 11 in (280 mm) model was discontinued on October 27, 2016. In June 2017, the 13 in (330 mm) model received a processor speed increase from 1.6 GHz to 1.8 GHz. The 2017 model remained available for sale after Apple launched the next generation in 2018. It was discontinued on July 9, 2019, with the introduction of the updated Retina MacBook Air models. Before its discontinuation it was Apple's last MacBook model with USB Type-A ports, a non-Retina display (TN 6-bit color panel) and a user-upgradable SSD. It was previously the last MacBook to feature a backlit rear Apple logo until the PROLED MacBook Pro was introduced in 2026.

=== Retina (2018–2020) ===
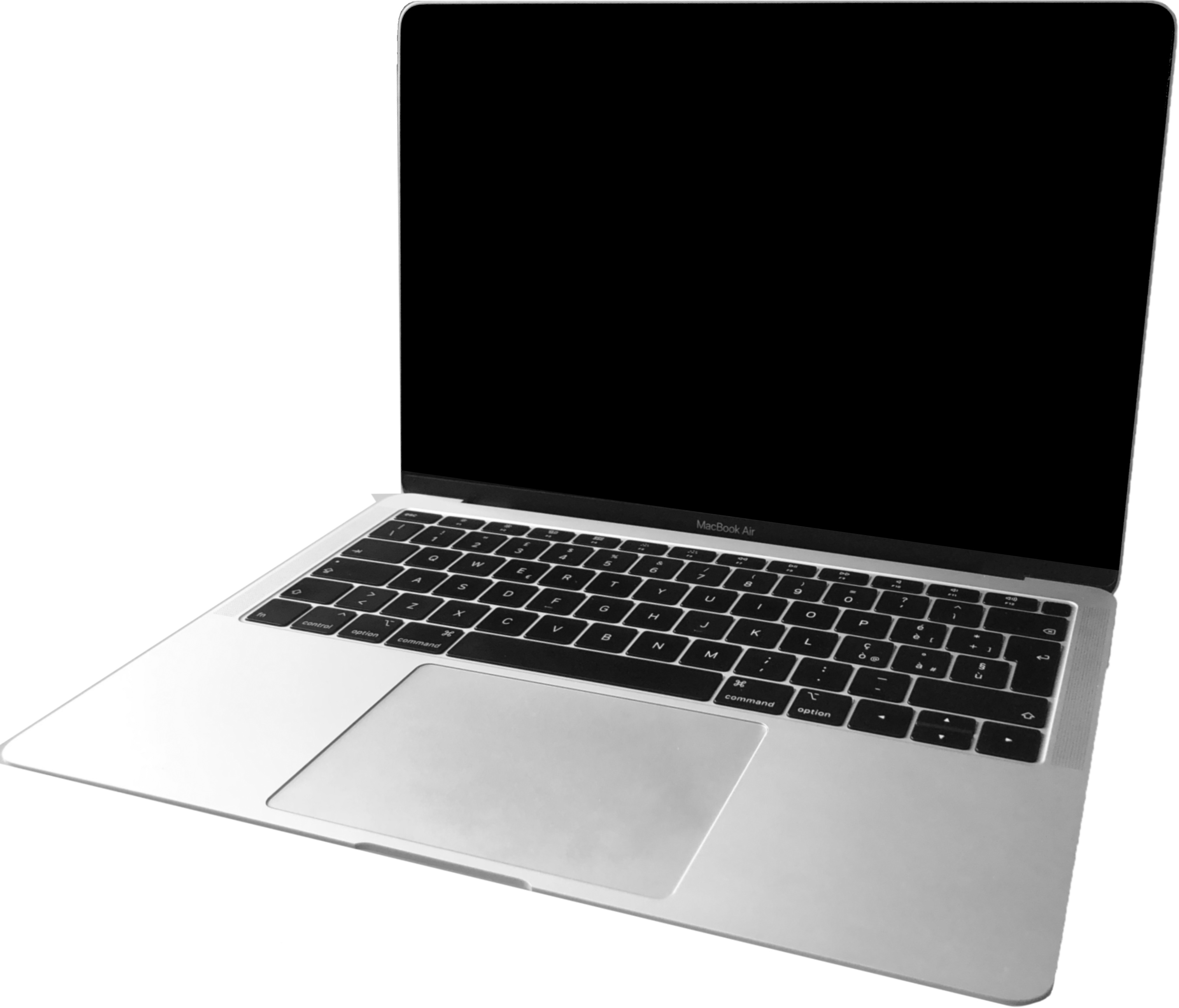
Retina MacBook Air (2018)

On October 30, 2018, Apple released a new MacBook Air with Amber Lake processors, a 13.3 in (340 mm) Retina display with a resolution of 2560×1600 pixels, Touch ID, and two combination USB-C 3.1 Gen 2/Thunderbolt 3 ports plus one audio jack. The screen displays 48% more color, and the bezels are 50% narrower than the previous generation and occupies 17% less volume. Thickness was reduced to 15.6 mm (0.61 in) and weight to 1.25 kilograms (2.76 pounds). It was available in three finishes, silver, space gray, and gold. Unlike the previous generation, this model could not be configured with an Intel Core i7 processor. This was the first generation of MacBook Air to feature the Apple T2 security chip.

The base 2018 model came with 8 GB of 2133 MHz LPDDR3 RAM, 128 GB SSD, Intel Core i5 processor (1.6 GHz base clock, with Turbo up to 3.6 GHz) with Intel UHD Graphics 617.

Apple released updated models in July 2019 with True Tone display technology and an updated butterfly keyboard using the same components as the 2019 MacBook Pro. A test found that the 256 GB SSD in the 2019 model has a 35% lower read speed than the 256 GB SSD in the 2018 model, though the write speed is slightly faster.

Updated models were released in March 2020 with Ice Lake Intel Core i3, i5 and i7 processors, updated graphics, support for 6K output to run the Pro Display XDR and other 6K monitors, and replaced the butterfly keyboard with a Magic Keyboard design similar to that initially found in the 2019 16-inch MacBook Pro.

== Apple silicon ==
=== M1 (2020–2024) ===
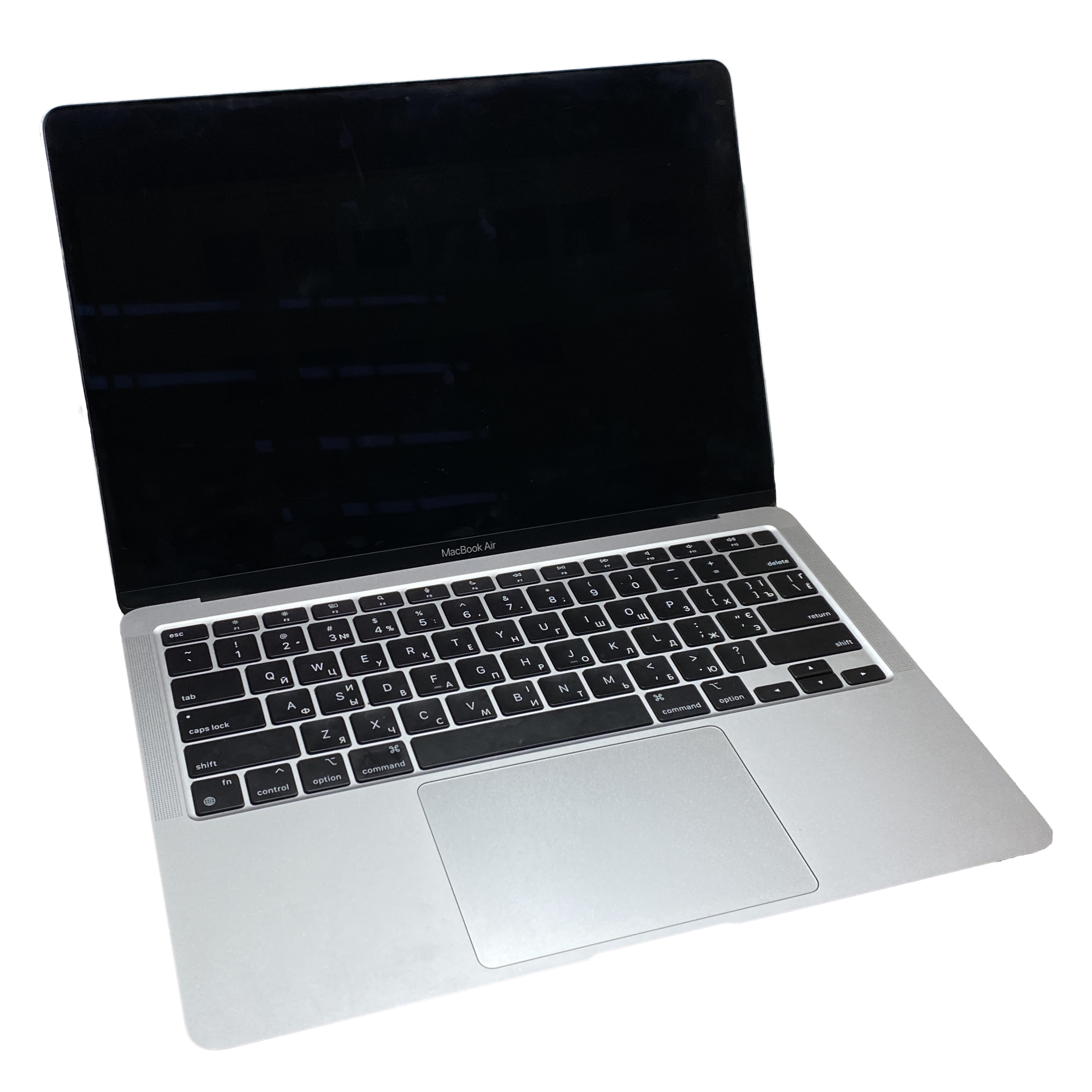
The MacBook Air (M1, 2020) has a similar design to its Intel predecessor.

On November 10, 2020, Apple announced the MacBook Air with an Apple-designed M1 processor, launched alongside an updated Mac Mini and 13 in (330 mm) MacBook Pro as the first Macs with Apple's new line of custom ARM-based Apple silicon processors. The device incorporates a fanless design, the first ever on any MacBook Air. It also adds support for Wi-Fi 6, USB4 / Thunderbolt 3 and Wide color (P3). The M1 MacBook Air can only run one external display, unlike the previous Intel-based model that was capable of running two 4K displays. The FaceTime camera remains 720p but Apple advertises an improved image signal processor for higher quality video.

The M1 MacBook Air received widespread positive reviews, with reviewers praising the fast performance and long battery life.

=== M2 and later (2022–present) ===
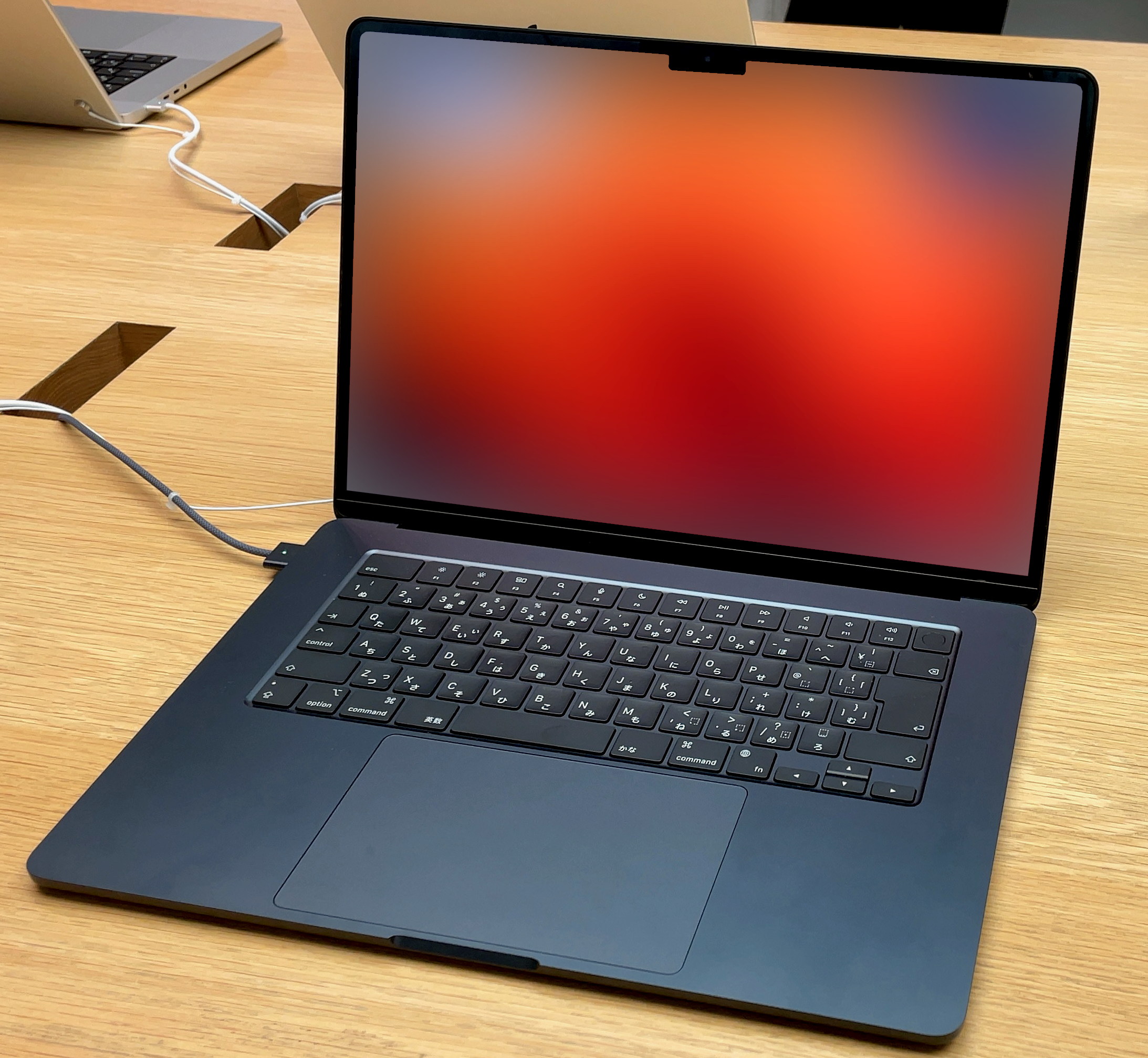
A Japanese MacBook Air (M2, 15-inch, 2023) running macOS Ventura (blurred)

On June 6, 2022, during the 2022 Worldwide Developers Conference (WWDC), Apple announced their second-generation processor, called M2, with an improved performance versus the previous M1 processor. The first computer to receive this new chip was a redesigned MacBook Air.

The latest MacBook Air was redesigned away from the tapered body in 2022 to match the latest MacBook Pro models and upgraded to the M2 processor. The new model was given a larger 13.6-inch (350 mm) screen and brought back MagSafe, now the third iteration of Apple's magnetic laptop charger ports.

This complete redesign features a thinner, flat design, doing away with the familiar wedge shape chassis that MacBook Air was most known for having. The new MacBook Air takes on hardware design cues from the 14 and 16 inches (360 and 410 mm) MacBook Pro notebooks released on October 26, 2021, such as a thinner, lighter, flat chassis with 20% less volume than the previous MacBook Air. Other features include MagSafe 3, which also supports fast charging up to 50% in 30 minutes with a 67 W or greater power adapter, a taller 13.6-inch (350 mm) Liquid Retina display with 500 nits max brightness (25% brighter than the previous MacBook Air), a 1080p FaceTime Camera, a three-mic array with advanced beam-forming algorithms, a high-impedance headphone jack, four-speaker sound system with Spatial Audio, full height function keys, and four finishes (Silver, Space Gray, Starlight, and Midnight). The Gold color has been discontinued and replaced by the Starlight color found with the introduction of the iPhone 13 in 2021.

On June 5, 2023, during the 2023 WWDC, Apple announced the new 15.3-inch (390 mm) display size option for the M2 MacBook Air lineup, with the advanced six-speaker sound system along with the major technical features such as 1080p FaceTime camera and MagSafe charging. Orders for the 15 in (380 mm) MacBook Air started on June 5, with the general availability having started on June 13.

On March 4, 2024, Apple announced a refreshed M3 MacBook Air in both 13 and 15 in (330 and 380 mm) sizes. This model retains the same design as the M2 MacBook Air but adds support for two external displays when the lid is closed.

On March 5, 2025, Apple announced an updated MacBook Air, now with the M4 chip. This model retains the same design as the M2 and M3 MacBook Air but adds support for two external displays with the internal display on, a new color (Sky Blue, which replaces the Space Gray color from previous models), a new 12 MP Center Stage camera, and a lower starting price. The M4 MacBook Air can reach up to 20 hours operating time on a single charge, making it the longest-lasting Air battery to date.

The M4 MacBook Air was positively received by critics, with Brenda Stolyar of Wired praising its great performance, bright display, updated webcam, long battery life, and double the base memory. Mark Spoonauer of Tom's Guide called it "the best MacBook for most people and for me the top laptop for most people, period".

On March 11, 2026, Apple announced a MacBook Air model with the M5 chip. The model retains its design and features up to a 15% faster CPU, 30% faster GPU, and significantly higher artificial intelligence processing capabilities, making it roughly 30% faster than the M4 chip.

== Supported operating systems ==
=== macOS ===
macOS Sequoia will work with Wi-Fi and graphics acceleration on unsupported MacBook Air computers (except for the 2018 and 2019 models) with a compatible third-party patch utility. The 2013 through 2017 models can already run macOS Tahoe with it, but 2012 models or earlier are still not compatible at all.

The MacBook Air 2018 and 2019 models cannot currently be patched due to an issue with the T2 Security Chip that prevents them from running macOS Sequoia.

Supported macOS releases on MacBook Air
OS release	Intel-based													Apple silicon					
OS release	Unibody			Tapered Unibody							Retina			M1	M2		M3	M4	M5
OS release	Original	Late 2008	Mid 2009	Late 2010	Mid 2011	Mid 2012	Mid 2013	Early 2014	Early 2015	2017	2018	2019	2020	2020	2022	2023	2024	2025	2026
10.4 Tiger	Partial (Note: Requires at least 10.4.9 due to 64-bit EFI. No graphics acceleration is available for the GMA X3100. Trackpad settings and function keys are unavailable. Backlight keyboard and sleep does not work. Audio input/output will only work with "Mac OS X 10.4.11 Combo Update".)	—N/a	—N/a	—N/a	—N/a	—N/a	—N/a	—N/a	—N/a	—N/a	—N/a	—N/a	—N/a	—N/a	—N/a	—N/a	—N/a	—N/a	—N/a
10.5 Leopard	10.5.1	10.5.5	10.5.6	—N/a	—N/a	—N/a	—N/a	—N/a	—N/a	—N/a	—N/a	—N/a	—N/a	—N/a	—N/a	—N/a	—N/a	—N/a	—N/a
10.6 Snow Leopard	Yes	Yes	Yes	10.6.4	Partial	—N/a	—N/a	—N/a	—N/a	—N/a	—N/a	—N/a	—N/a	—N/a	—N/a	—N/a	—N/a	—N/a	—N/a
10.7 Lion	Yes	Yes	Yes	Yes	Yes	10.7.4	—N/a	—N/a	—N/a	—N/a	—N/a	—N/a	—N/a	—N/a	—N/a	—N/a	—N/a	—N/a	—N/a
10.8 Mountain Lion	Patch	Yes	Yes	Yes	Yes	Yes	10.8.4	Unofficial	—N/a	—N/a	—N/a	—N/a	—N/a	—N/a	—N/a	—N/a	—N/a	—N/a	—N/a
10.9 Mavericks	Patch (Note: There are no graphics drivers available for the GMA X3100 after OS X Mountain Lion.)	Yes	Yes	Yes	Yes	Yes	Yes	10.9.2	—N/a	—N/a	—N/a	—N/a	—N/a	—N/a	—N/a	—N/a	—N/a	—N/a	—N/a
10.10 Yosemite	Patch	Yes	Yes	Yes	Yes	Yes	Yes	Yes	10.10.2	Unofficial	—N/a	—N/a	—N/a	—N/a	—N/a	—N/a	—N/a	—N/a	—N/a
10.11 El Capitan	Patch	Yes	Yes	Yes	Yes	Yes	Yes	Yes	Yes	Unofficial	—N/a	—N/a	—N/a	—N/a	—N/a	—N/a	—N/a	—N/a	—N/a
10.12 Sierra	No	Patch		Yes	Yes	Yes	Yes	Yes	Yes	10.12.4	—N/a	—N/a	—N/a	—N/a	—N/a	—N/a	—N/a	—N/a	—N/a
10.13 High Sierra	No	Patch		Yes	Yes	Yes	Yes	Yes	Yes	Yes	—N/a	—N/a	—N/a	—N/a	—N/a	—N/a	—N/a	—N/a	—N/a
10.14 Mojave	No	Patch				Yes	Yes	Yes	Yes	Yes	10.14.1	10.14.5	—N/a	—N/a	—N/a	—N/a	—N/a	—N/a	—N/a
10.15 Catalina	No	Patch				Yes	Yes	Yes	Yes	Yes	Yes	Yes	10.15.3	—N/a	—N/a	—N/a	—N/a	—N/a	—N/a
11 Big Sur	No	Patch					Yes	Yes	Yes	Yes	Yes	Yes	Yes	Yes	—N/a	—N/a	—N/a	—N/a	—N/a
12 Monterey	No	Patch							Yes	Yes	Yes	Yes	Yes	Yes	12.4	—N/a	—N/a	—N/a	—N/a
13 Ventura	No	Patch									Yes	Yes	Yes	Yes	Yes	13.4	—N/a	—N/a	—N/a
14 Sonoma	No	Patch (Note: macOS Sonoma cannot be installed in 2 GB RAM models since the installer will not work. However, the OS can still be run if installed from another machine. 4 GB RAM models are unaffected.)				Patch					Yes	Yes	Yes	Yes	Yes	Yes	14.3	—N/a	—N/a
15 Sequoia	No	Patch (Note: macOS Sequoia cannot be installed in these models since it has 2 GB RAM as standard, so the installer will not work. However, the OS can still be run if installed from another machine, although having mixed results due the lack of RAM.)		Patch (Note: macOS Sequoia cannot be installed in 2 GB RAM models, so the installer will not work on them. However, the OS can still be run if installed from another machine, although having mixed results due the lack of RAM. 4 GB RAM models are unaffected.)		Patch					No	No	Yes	Yes	Yes	Yes	Yes	15.3	—N/a
26 Tahoe	No	No	No	No	No	No	Patch				No	No	No	Yes	Yes	Yes	Yes	Yes	26.3
27 Golden Gate	No	No	No	No	No	No	No	No	No	No	No	No	No	Yes	Yes	Yes	Yes	Yes	Yes

=== Windows through Boot Camp (Intel only) ===
Boot Camp Assistant allows Intel Macs to dual-boot Windows. Apple silicon Macs do not support Boot Camp, even with ARM-based version of Windows 10 and 11.

Supported Windows versions on MacBook Air
OS release		2008–2009	2010	2011	2012	2013–2014	2015–2020	
Windows XP (Note: Windows XP can only be installed on Macs with Boot Camp 3 or earlier. This includes Mac OS X 10.6 or earlier and copies of Mac OS X 10.7 that have not been updated to Boot Camp 4.)		Yes	No	No	No	No	No	No
Windows Vista	32-bit (Note: Windows Vista can only be installed on Macs with Boot Camp 3 or earlier. This includes Mac OS X 10.6 or earlier and copies of Mac OS X 10.7 that have not been updated to Boot Camp 4.)	Yes	No	No	No	No	No	No
Windows Vista	64-bit	No	No	No	No	No	No	No
Windows 7	32-bit (Note: The 32-bit version of Windows 7 can only be installed on Macs with Boot Camp 3.1 to 6.0. This includes OS X 10.11 and earlier.)	Yes	Yes	Yes	Yes	No	No	No
Windows 7	64-bit (Note: The 64-bit version of Windows 7 can only be installed on Macs with Boot Camp 3.1 or later, running macOS High Sierra or earlier. Later versions of macOS no longer support Windows 7.)	No	Yes	Yes	Yes	Yes	No	No
Windows 8 (Note: Windows 8 can only be installed on Macs with Boot Camp 5.0 to 6.0. This includes OS X 10.11 and earlier.) (Note: Only 64-bit versions of Windows are supported for Windows 8 and later.)		No	No	Yes	Yes	Yes	Yes	No
Windows 8.1 (Note: Windows 8.1 can only be installed on Macs with Boot Camp 5.1 or later, running macOS High Sierra or earlier. Later versions of macOS no longer support Windows 8.1.)		No	No	Yes	Yes	Yes	Yes	No
Windows 10 (Note: Windows 10 can only be installed on Macs with Boot Camp 6.0 or later. It is the only supported version of Windows on macOS Mojave and later.)		No	No	Patch	Yes	Yes	Yes	Yes

== Current lineup ==
Release date	Model	Processor
March 11, 2026	MacBook Air (13-inch, M5)	Apple M5
March 11, 2026	MacBook Air (15-inch, M5)	Apple M5

== Timeline ==
Timeline of portable Macintoshes
See also: List of Mac models

== See also ==
- MacBook
- MacBook (12-inch)
- iBook
