= Embedded C++ =

Programming language

Embedded C++ (EC++) is a dialect of the C++ programming language for embedded systems. It was defined by an industry group led by major Japanese central processing unit (CPU) manufacturers, including NEC, Hitachi, Fujitsu, and Toshiba, to address the shortcomings of C++ for embedded applications. The goal of the effort is to preserve the most useful object-oriented features of the C++ language yet minimize code size while maximizing execution efficiency and making compiler construction simpler. The official website states the goal as "to provide embedded systems programmers with a subset of C++ that is easy for the average C programmer to understand and use".

== Differences from C++ ==
Embedded C++ excludes some features of C++.

Feature	ISO/ANSI C C++	Embedded C++
Exception handling	Yes	No
Multiple inheritance	Yes	No
mutable, a storage class specifier	Yes	No
Namespaces	Yes	No
Templates	Yes	No
Run-time type information (typeid)	Yes	No
Style casts (static_cast, dynamic_cast, reinterpret_cast, and const_cast)	Yes	No
Virtual base classes	Yes	No

Some compilers, such as those from Green Hills and IAR Systems, allow certain features of ISO/ANSI C++ to be enabled in Embedded C++. IAR Systems calls this "Extended Embedded C++".

=== Compilation ===
An EC++ program can be compiled with any C++ compiler. But, a compiler specific to EC++ may have an easier time doing optimization.

Compilers specific to EC++ are provided by companies such as:

- IAR Systems
- Freescale Semiconductor, (spin-off from Motorola in 2004 who had acquired Metrowerks in 1999)
- Tasking Software, part of Altium Limited
- Green Hills Software

== Criticism ==
The language has had a poor reception with many expert C++ programmers. In particular, Bjarne Stroustrup says, "To the best of my knowledge EC++ is dead (2004), and if it isn't it ought to be." In fact, the official English EC++ website has not been updated since 2002. Nevertheless, a restricted subset of C++ (based on Embedded C++) has been adopted by Apple Inc. as the exclusive programming language to create all I/O Kit device drivers for Apple's macOS, iPadOS and iOS operating systems of the popular Macintosh, iPhone, and iPad products. Apple engineers felt the exceptions, multiple inheritance, templates, and runtime type information features of standard C++ were either insufficient or not efficient enough for use in a high-performance, multithreaded kernel.
