= Mac OS X Panther =

2003 operating system version

Mac OS X 10.3 Panther
- Version of the macOS operating system
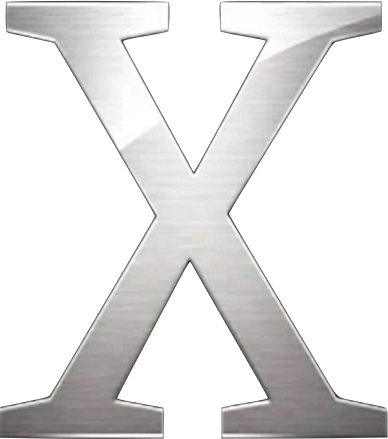

- Screenshot of Mac OS X Panther. The Finder icon in the Dock has been changed and Internet Explorer has been replaced by Safari.
- Developer: Apple Inc.
- OS family: Macintosh; Unix-like
- Working state: No longer supported
- Source model: Closed, with open source components
- General availability: October 24, 2003; 23 years ago
- Latest release: 10.3.9 / April 15, 2005; 21 years ago
- Supported platforms: PowerPC
- Kernel type: Hybrid (XNU)
- License: Apple Public Source License (APSL) and Apple end-user license agreement (EULA)
- Preceded by: Mac OS X 10.2 Jaguar
- Succeeded by: Mac OS X 10.4 Tiger
- Official website: Mac OS X Panther (archived at Wayback Machine)
- Tagline: The evolution of the species.

Support status
- Historical, unsupported as of March 4, 2007

Mac OS X Panther (version 10.3) is the fourth major release of macOS, Apple's desktop and server operating system. It followed Mac OS X Jaguar and preceded Mac OS X Tiger. It was released on October 24, 2003, with the retail price of US$129 for a single user and US$199 for a five user, family license.

The main features of Panther included a refined Aqua theme, Exposé, Fast user switching, and an updated Finder interface. Panther also included Safari as its default browser, as a change from Internet Explorer in Jaguar.

== System requirements ==
Panther's system requirements are:

- PowerPC G3, G4, or G5 processor (at least 233 MHz)
- Built-in USB
- At least 128 MB of RAM
- At least 1.5 GB of available hard disk space
- A CD Drive for installation

Macs that are compatible with Panther:

- Power Mac G5--all models except Power Mac G5 (Early 2005), Power Mac G5 (Late 2005) which use Mac OS X 10.4
- Power Mac G4 or Macintosh Server G4--all models
- Power Macintosh G3 or Macintosh Server G3 that have built-in USB ports
- iMac--all models released in 2004 or earlier
- iBook--all models except iBook G4 (Mid 2005) which uses Mac OS X 10.4
- PowerBook G4--all models except PowerBook G4 (Double-Layer SD) which uses Mac OS X 10.4
- PowerBook G3--Bronze Keyboard models only

See Power PC Mac models

== New and changed features ==
Apple advertised that Mac OS X Panther had over 150 new features, including:

- Finder was updated with a brushed-metal interface, and given a new live search engine, a customizable Sidebar, secure deletion, colored labels (resurrected from classic Mac OS) in the filesystem and Zip support built in. The Finder icon was also changed.
- Fast user switching was introduced; it allows a user to remain logged in while another user logs in, and supports quickly switching among several sessions.
- Exposé is a new feature that helps the user manage windows by showing them all as thumbnails.
- TextEdit is now compatible with Microsoft Word (.doc) documents.
- Xcode developer tools have faster compile times with gcc 3.3.
- Preview has increased speed of PDF rendering.
- QuickTime now supports the Pixlet high-definition video codec.
- Font Book is a font manager which simplifies viewing character maps, and adding new fonts that can be used systemwide. The app also allows the user to organize fonts into collections.
- FileVault is a new app that has on-the-fly encryption and decryption of a user's home folder.
- iChat AV now has built-in audio- and video conferencing.
- X11: Compatibility for applications based on the X Window System, commonly used for UNIX applications, is available through an optional install, found in the install disk. Mac OS X Panther is the first macOS version to officially support X11. It utilizes Quartz to provide hardware accelerated graphics and is based on the XFree86 implementation of X Window System.
- Safari is a new web browser that was developed to replace Internet Explorer for Mac when the contract between Apple and Microsoft ended, although Internet Explorer for Mac was still available. Safari 1.0 was included in an update in Jaguar but was used as the default browser in Panther.
- Microsoft Windows interoperability improvements were made, including out-of-the-box support for Active Directory and SecurID-based VPNs.
- Built-in fax support. Sending a fax can be done using the native Print dialog. To receive faxes, users must pre-configure in System Preferences on how the system should handle an incoming fax, with options including selecting a folder to save the incoming faxes, to automatically email to an address or to print via a selected printer, upon receiving of the fax.
- Secure Empty Trash is a feature added in Mac OS X Panther to ensure, through the use of data erasure techniques, that deleted files cannot be recovered.
- Panther added support for WPA and WPA2 level security on wireless networks (with the AirPort 4.2 software update).

== Release history ==
Version	Build	Date	Darwin version	Notes
10.3	7B85	October 24, 2003	7.0	Original retail release set
10.3	7B86	October 24, 2003	7.0	Server Edition
10.3.1	7C107	November 10, 2003	7.1	
10.3.2	7D24	December 17, 2003	7.2	
10.3.2	7D28		7.2	Updated retail release
10.3.3	7F44	March 15, 2004	7.3	Added network volumes available on the finder sidebar and the desktop; updated applications.
10.3.4	7H63	May 26, 2004	7.4	
10.3.5	7M34	August 9, 2004	7.5	Updated retail release set
10.3.6	7R28	November 5, 2004	7.6	
10.3.7	7S215	December 15, 2004	7.7	
10.3.8	7U16	February 9, 2005	7.8	
10.3.9	7W98	April 15, 2005	7.9	

== Timeline ==
Timeline of Mac operating systems

Preceded by Mac OS X 10.2 (Jaguar)	Mac OS X 10.3 (Panther); 2003	Succeeded by Mac OS X 10.4 (Tiger)
