= Automatic Reference Counting =

Memory management feature of the Clang compiler

Automatic Reference Counting (ARC) is a memory management feature of the Clang compiler providing automatic reference counting for the Objective-C and Swift programming languages. At compile time, it inserts into the object code messages retain and release which increase and decrease the reference count at run time, marking for deallocation those objects when the number of references to them reaches zero.

ARC differs from tracing garbage collection in that there is no background process that deallocates the objects asynchronously at runtime. Unlike tracing garbage collection, ARC does not handle reference cycles automatically. This means that as long as there are "strong" references to an object, it will not be deallocated. Strong cross-references can accordingly create deadlocks and memory leaks. It is up to the developer to break cycles by using weak references.

Apple Inc. deploys ARC in their operating systems, such as macOS (OS X) and iOS. Limited support (ARCLite) has been available since Mac OS X Snow Leopard and iOS 4, with complete support following in Mac OS X Lion and iOS 5. Garbage collection was declared deprecated in OS X Mountain Lion, in favor of ARC, and removed from the Objective-C runtime library in macOS Sierra.

== Objective-C ==
The following rules are enforced by the compiler when ARC is turned on:

- retain, release, retainCount, autorelease or dealloc cannot be sent to objects. Instead, the compiler inserts these messages at compile time automatically, including [super dealloc] when dealloc is overridden.
  // Without ARC
- (void)dealloc
{
   [[NSNotificationCenter defaultCenter] removeObserver:self];
   [super dealloc];
}

// With ARC
- (void)dealloc
{
   [[NSNotificationCenter defaultCenter] removeObserver:self];
   // [super dealloc] is called automatically
}
- Programs cannot cast directly between id and void *. This includes casting between Foundation objects and Core Foundation objects. Programs must use special casts, or calls to special functions, to tell the compiler more information about an object's lifetime.
  // Without ARC
- (NSString *)giveMeAString
{
    CFStringRef myString = [self someMethodThatCreatesACFString];
    NSString *newString = (NSString *)myString;
    return [newString autorelease];
}

// With ARC
- (NSString *)giveMeAString
{
    CFStringRef myString = [self someMethodThatCreatesACFString]; // retain count is 1
    NSString *newString = (__bridge_transfer NSString *)myString; // the ownership has now been transferred into ARC
    return newString;
}
- An autorelease pool can be used to allocate objects temporarily and retain them in memory until the pool is "drained". Without ARC, an NSAutoreleasePool object can be created for this purpose. ARC uses @autoreleasepool blocks instead, which encapsulate the allocation of the temporary objects and deallocates them when the end of the block is reached.
  // Without ARC
- (void)loopThroughArray:(NSArray *)array
{
    for (id object in array) {
        NSAutoreleasePool *pool = [[NSAutoreleasePool alloc] init];
        // Create a lot of temporary objects
        [pool drain];
    }
}

// With ARC
- (void)loopThroughArray:(NSArray *)array
{
    for (id object in array) {
        @autoreleasepool {
            // Create a lot of temporary objects
        }
    }
}
- Programs cannot call the functions NSAllocateObject and NSDeallocateObject
- Programs cannot use object pointers in C structures (structs)
- Programs cannot use memory zones (NSZone)
- To properly cooperate with non-ARC code, programs must use no method or declared property (unless explicitly choosing a different getter) that starts with new.

=== Property declarations ===
ARC introduces some new property declaration attributes, some of which replace the old attributes.

Without ARC	With ARC	With ARCLite (Note: ARCLite is ARC but without zeroing weak references (used when deploying to a less-capable operating environment than ARC requires).)
retain	strong	
assign (for object types)	weak	unsafe_unretained
copy

=== Zeroing weak references ===
Zeroing weak references is a feature in Objective-C ARC that automatically clears (sets to nil) weak-reference local variables, instance variables, and declared properties immediately before the object being pointed to starts deallocating. This ensures that the pointer goes to either a valid object or nil, and avoids dangling pointers. Prior to the introduction of this feature, "weak references" referred to references that were not retaining, but were not set to nil when the object they pointed to was deallocated (equivalent to unsafe_unretained in ARC), thus possibly leading to a dangling pointer. The programmer typically had to ensure that all possible weak references to an object were set to nil manually when it was being deallocated. Zeroing weak references obviates the need to do this.

Zeroing weak references are indicated by using the declared property attribute weak or by using the variable attribute __weak.

Zeroing weak references are only available in Mac OS X Lion (10.7) or later and iOS 5 or later, because they require additional support from the Objective-C runtime. However, some OS X classes do not currently support weak references. Code that uses ARC but needs to support versions of the OS older than those above cannot use zeroing weak references, and therefore must use unsafe_unretained weak references. There exists a third-party library called PLWeakCompatibility that allows one to use zeroing weak references even on these older OS versions.

=== Converting to ===
Xcode 4.2 or later provides a way to convert code to ARC. As of Xcode 4.5, it is found by choosing Edit > Refactor > Convert to Objective-C ARC... Although Xcode will automatically convert most code, some code may have to be converted manually. Xcode will inform the developer when more complex use cases arise, such as when a variable is declared inside an autorelease pool and used outside it or when two objects need to be toll-free bridged with special casts.

== Swift ==
In Swift, references to objects are strong, unless they are declared weak or unowned. Swift requires explicit handling of nil with the Optional type: a value type that can either have a value or be nil. An Optional type must be handled by "unwrapping" it with a conditional statement, allowing safe usage of the value, if present. Conversely, any non-Optional type will always have a value and cannot be nil.

var myString: String                   // Can only be a string
var myOtherString: String?             // Can be a string or nil

if let myString = myOtherString {      // Unwrap the Optional
    print(myString)                    // Print the string, if present
}

Accordingly, a strong reference to an object can be of both Optional and non-Optional type (optionality and reference strength are different, albeit related, concepts). A weak reference is always of type Optional, as the object can be deallocated and the reference automatically be set to nil. Unowned references are like weak references but are not set to nil automatically by ARC. They can be either non-Optional or Optional. An unowned reference is expected to always have a value, so accessing the value of an unowned reference after the referenced instance has been deallocated, will result in a runtime error.

var strongReference: MyClass          // Strong non-Optional reference, cannot be nil
var strongOptionalReference: MyClass? // Strong Optional reference, can be nil (manually)
weak var weakReference: MyClass?      // Weak reference, always Optional, can be nil (automatically or manually)
unowned var unownedReference: MyClass // Unowned non-Optional reference, cannot be nil

Swift also differs from Objective-C in its usage and encouragement of value types instead of reference types. Most types in the Swift standard library are value types and they are copied by value, whereas classes and closures are reference types and passed by reference. Because value types are copied when passed around, they are deallocated automatically when the program leaves the scope that contains them.

== See also ==
- Smart pointer
