= BridgeOS =

Embedded operating system by Apple

bridgeOS
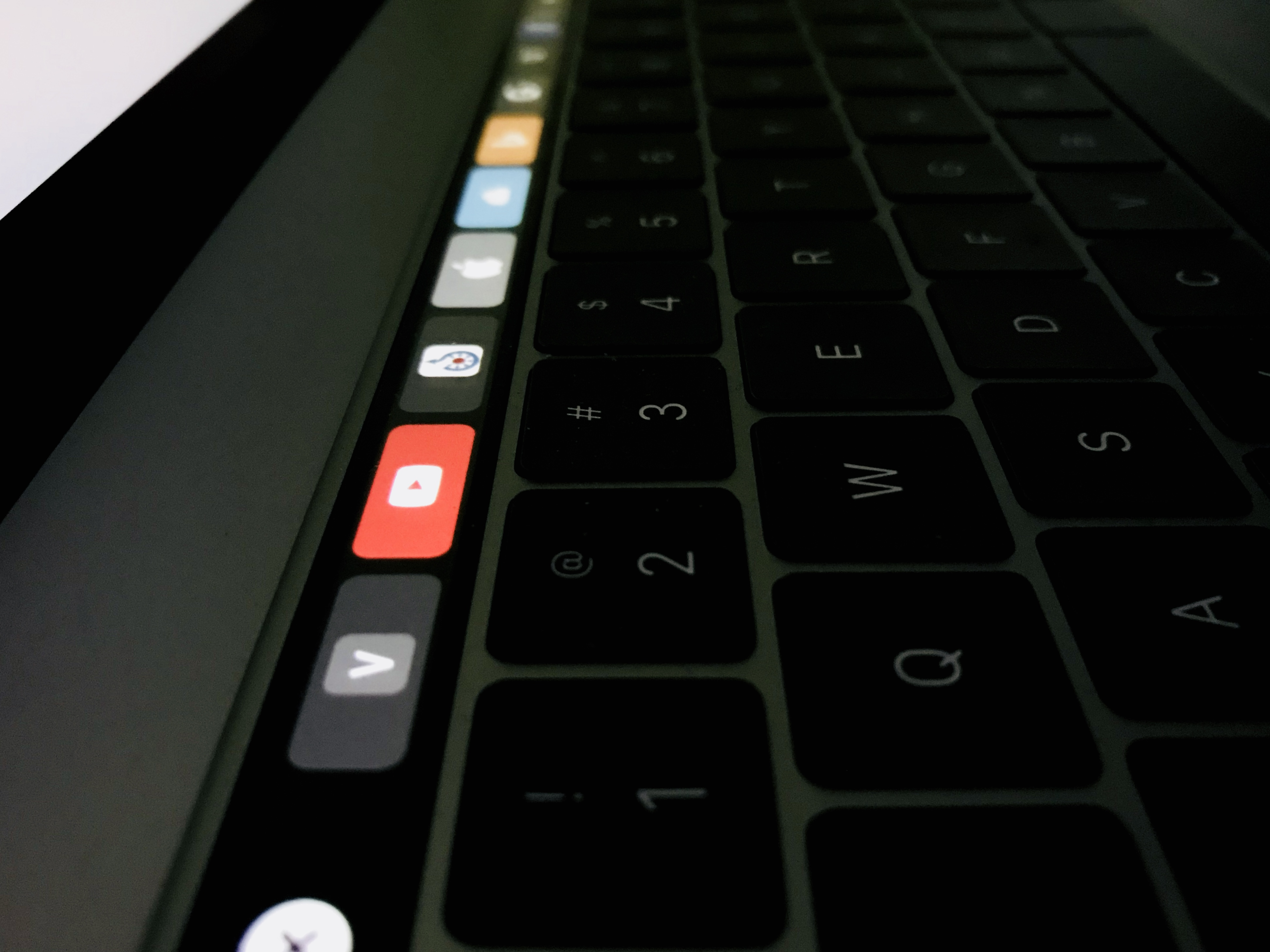
- A MacBook Pro Touch Bar powered by bridgeOS
- Developer: Apple
- Written in: C; C++; Objective-C; Swift; assembly language
- OS family: Unix-like, iOS
- Working state: Current
- Source model: Closed, with open-source components
- Initial release: October 27, 2016; 9 years ago
- Update method: FOTA (via Mac running macOS)
- Supported platforms: T series (2016 MacBook Pro and later)
- License: Proprietary software except for open-source components

Support status
- Supported

bridgeOS is an embedded operating system created and developed by Apple for use exclusively with its hardware. bridgeOS runs on the T series Apple silicon processors and operates devices such as the OLED touchscreen strip called the "Touch Bar", Touch ID fingerprint sensor, disk encryption, and cooling fans.

At boot time, the bootloader executes the bridgeOS kernel, then the bridgeOS kernel passes off to the UEFI firmware.

bridgeOS is based on Apple's watchOS.
