= MacOS version history =

History of Apple's current Mac operating system

The history of macOS, Apple's current Mac operating system (formerly named Mac OS X until 2011 and then OS X until 2016), began with the company's project to replace its classic Mac OS. That system, up to and including its final release Mac OS 9, was a direct descendant of the operating system Apple had used in its Mac computers since their introduction in 1984. The current macOS is a UNIX operating system built on technology that had been developed at NeXT from the 1980s until Apple purchased the company in early 1997.

macOS components derived from BSD include multiuser access, TCP/IP networking, and memory protection.

Although it was originally marketed as simply "version 10" of Mac OS (indicated by the Roman numeral "X"), it has a completely different codebase from Mac OS 9, as well as substantial changes to its user interface (UI). The transition was a technologically and strategically significant one. To ease the transition for users and developers, versions 10.0 through 10.4 were able to run Mac OS 9 and its applications in the Classic Environment, a compatibility layer.

macOS was first released in 1999 as Mac OS X Server 1.0, built using the technologies Apple acquired from NeXT, but did not include the signature Aqua UI. Mac OS X 10.0 is the first desktop version, aimed at regular users, released in March 2001. Several more distinct desktop and server editions of macOS have been released since. Mac OS X Server is no longer offered as a standalone operating system with the release of Mac OS X 10.7 Lion. Instead, server management tools were provided as an application, available as a separate add-on, until it was discontinued on April 21, 2022, making it incompatible with macOS 13 Ventura or later.

Releases of macOS, starting with the Intel build of Mac OS X 10.5 Leopard, are certified as Unix systems conforming to the Single UNIX Specification.

Mac OS X Lion was the first release for which the shortened OS X name was occasionally used, where it was sometimes called OS X Lion, but this naming scheme was first officially adopted as the sole branding with OS X Mountain Lion. The operating system was further renamed macOS with the release of macOS Sierra.

Mac OS X 10.0 and 10.1 were given names of big cats as internal code names, Cheetah and Puma. Starting with Mac OS X 10.2 Jaguar, big-cat names were used as marketing names. Beginning with OS X 10.9 Mavericks, names of locations in California were used as marketing names instead.

macOS retained the major version number 10 throughout its development history until the release of macOS 11 Big Sur in 2020, where its major version number was incremented by one with each release. In 2025, Apple unified the versioning across all products, including its other operating systems, to match the year after its WWDC announcement, beginning with macOS 26 Tahoe, which was released on September 15, 2025.

== Development ==
=== Development outside Apple ===
A diagram of the relationships between Unix systems, including the ancestors of macOS

After Apple removed Steve Jobs from management in 1985, he left the company and, with funding from Ross Perot, founded NeXT, Inc. The result was the NeXT Computer. As the first workstation to include a digital signal processor (DSP) and a high-capacity optical disc drive, NeXT hardware was advanced for its time, but was expensive relative to the rapidly commoditizing workstation market. Although the hardware was phased out in 1993, the company's object-oriented operating system, NeXTSTEP, had a more lasting legacy as it eventually became the basis for Mac OS X.

NeXTSTEP was based on the Mach kernel developed at Carnegie Mellon University (CMU) and BSD, an implementation of Unix dating back to the 1970s. It featured an object-oriented programming framework based on the Objective-C language. This environment is known today in the Mac world as Cocoa. It also supported the innovative Enterprise Objects Framework database access layer and WebObjects application server development environment, among other notable features.

All but abandoning the idea of an operating system, NeXT managed to maintain a business selling WebObjects and consulting services, only ever making modest profits in its last few quarters as an independent company. NeXTSTEP underwent an evolution into OPENSTEP, which separated the object layers from the operating system below, allowing it to run with less modification on other platforms. OPENSTEP was, for a short time, adopted by Sun and HP.

By this point, however, a number of other companies — notably Apple, IBM, Microsoft, and even Sun itself — were claiming they would soon be releasing similar object-oriented operating systems and development tools of their own. Some of these efforts, such as Taligent, did not fully come to fruition; others, like Java, gained widespread adoption.

On February 4, 1997, Apple Computer acquired NeXT for $427 million, and used OPENSTEP as the basis for Mac OS X, as it was called at the time. Traces of the NeXT software heritage can still be seen in macOS. For example, in the Cocoa development environment, the Objective-C library classes have "NS" prefixes, and the HISTORY section of the manual page for the defaults command in macOS straightforwardly states that the command "First appeared in NeXTStep."

=== Internal development ===
Meanwhile, Apple was facing commercial difficulties of its own. The decade-old Macintosh System Software had reached the limits of its single-user, co-operative multitasking architecture, and its once-innovative user interface was looking increasingly outdated. A massive development effort to replace it, known as Copland, was started in 1994, but was generally perceived outside Apple to be a hopeless case due to political infighting and conflicting goals. By 1996, Copland was nowhere near ready for release, and the project was eventually cancelled. Some elements of Copland were incorporated into Mac OS 8, released on July 26, 1997.

After considering the purchase of BeOS — a multimedia-enabled, multi-tasking OS designed for hardware similar to Apple's, the company decided instead to acquire NeXT and use OPENSTEP as the basis for their new OS. Avie Tevanian took over OS development, and Steve Jobs was brought on as a consultant. At first, the plan was to develop a new operating system based almost entirely on an updated version of OPENSTEP, with the addition of a virtual machine subsystem — known as the Blue Box — for running "classic" Macintosh applications. The result was known by the code name Rhapsody, slated for release in late 1998.

Apple expected that developers would port their software to the considerably more powerful OPENSTEP libraries once they learned of its power and flexibility. Instead, several major developers such as Adobe told Apple that this would never occur, and that they would rather leave the platform entirely. This "rejection" of Apple's plan was largely the result of a string of previous broken promises from Apple; after watching one "next OS" after another disappear and Apple's market share dwindle, developers were not interested in doing much work on the platform at all, let alone a re-write.

=== Changed direction under Jobs ===
Apple's financial losses continued and the board of directors lost confidence in CEO Gil Amelio, asking him to resign. The board asked Steve Jobs to lead the company on an interim basis, essentially giving him carte blanche to make changes to return the company to profitability. When Jobs announced at the World Wide Developer's Conference in 1997 that what developers really wanted was a modern version of the Mac OS, which would enable the development of applications to be five to ten times faster, and Apple was going to deliver it, he was met with applause.

Over the next two years, a major effort was applied to porting the original Macintosh API to Unix libraries known as Carbon. Mac OS applications could be ported to Carbon without the need for a complete re-write, making them operate as native applications on the new operating system. Meanwhile, applications written using the older toolkits would be supported using the "Classic" Mac OS 9 environment. Support for C, C++, Objective-C, Java, and Python were added, furthering developer comfort with the new platform.

During this time, the lower layers of the operating system (the Mach kernel and the BSD layers on top of it) were re-packaged and released under the Apple Public Source License. They became known as Darwin. The Darwin kernel provides a stable and flexible operating system that takes advantage of the contributions of programmers and independent open-source projects outside Apple; nonetheless, it sees little use outside the Macintosh community.

During this period, the Java programming language had increased in popularity, and an effort was started to improve Mac Java support. This consisted of porting a high-speed Java virtual machine to the platform, and exposing macOS-specific "Cocoa" APIs to the Java language.

The first release of the new OS — Mac OS X Server 1.0 — used a modified version of the Mac OS GUI, but all client versions starting with Mac OS X Developer Preview 3 used a new theme known as Aqua. Aqua marked a significant shift from the Mac OS 9 interface, which had seen minimal changes since the original Macintosh OS. It introduced full-color scalable graphics, text and graphic anti-aliasing, simulated shading and highlights, transparency, shadows, and animation. A new feature was the Dock, an application launcher that took advantage of these capabilities.

Despite this, Mac OS X maintained a substantial degree of consistency with the traditional Mac OS interface and Apple's own Apple Human Interface Guidelines, with its pull-down menu at the top of the screen, familiar keyboard shortcuts, and support for a single-button mouse. The development of Aqua was delayed somewhat by the switch from OpenStep's Display PostScript engine to one developed in-house that was free of any license restrictions, known as Quartz.

== Overview ==
Overview of macOS versions
Release		Darwin version	Release date	Latest release		Compatibility		
Version	Name	Darwin version	Release date	Version	Release date	Processor	Application	Kernel
Mac OS X Server 1.0	Hera (Note: Internal codename.)	0.1-0.3	March 16, 1999	1.2v3	October 27, 2000	32-bit PowerPC	32-bit PowerPC	32-bit
Mac OS X 10.0	Cheetah	1.3.1	March 24, 2001	10.0.4	June 22, 2001	32-bit PowerPC	32-bit PowerPC	32-bit
Mac OS X 10.1	Puma	1.4.1/5	September 25, 2001	10.1.5	June 6, 2002	32-bit PowerPC	32-bit PowerPC	32-bit
Mac OS X 10.2	Jaguar	6	August 24, 2002	10.2.8	October 3, 2003	32/64-bit PowerPC (Note: The Power Mac G5 had special Jaguar builds.)	32-bit PowerPC	32-bit
Mac OS X 10.3	Panther	7	October 24, 2003	10.3.9	April 15, 2005	32/64-bit PowerPC	32-bit PowerPC	32-bit
Mac OS X 10.4	Tiger	8	April 29, 2005	10.4.11	November 14, 2007	32/64-bit PowerPC and Intel (Note: Tiger did not support 64-bit GUI applications, only 64-bit CLI applications.) (Note: 32-bit (but not 64-bit) PowerPC applications were supported on Intel processors with Rosetta.)		32-bit
Mac OS X 10.5	Leopard	9	October 26, 2007	10.5.8	August 13, 2009	32/64-bit PowerPC and Intel		32-bit
Mac OS X 10.6	Snow Leopard	10	August 28, 2009	10.6.8	July 25, 2011	32/64-bit Intel	32/64-bit Intel; 32-bit PowerPC	32/64-bit
Mac OS X 10.7	Lion	11	July 20, 2011	10.7.5	October 4, 2012	64-bit Intel	32/64-bit Intel	32/64-bit
OS X 10.8	Mountain Lion	12	July 25, 2012	10.8.5	August 13, 2015	64-bit Intel	32/64-bit Intel	64-bit
OS X 10.9	Mavericks	13	October 22, 2013	10.9.5	July 18, 2016	64-bit Intel	32/64-bit Intel	64-bit
OS X 10.10	Yosemite	14	October 16, 2014	10.10.5	July 19, 2017	64-bit Intel	32/64-bit Intel	64-bit
OS X 10.11	El Capitan	15	September 30, 2015	10.11.6	July 9, 2018	64-bit Intel	32/64-bit Intel	64-bit
macOS 10.12	Sierra	16	September 20, 2016	10.12.6	September 26, 2019	64-bit Intel	32/64-bit Intel	64-bit
macOS 10.13	High Sierra	17	September 25, 2017	10.13.6	November 12, 2020	64-bit Intel	32/64-bit Intel	64-bit
macOS 10.14	Mojave	18	September 24, 2018	10.14.6	July 21, 2021	64-bit Intel	32/64-bit Intel	64-bit
macOS 10.15	Catalina	19	October 7, 2019	10.15.8	February 2, 2026	64-bit Intel	64-bit Intel	64-bit
macOS 11	Big Sur	20	November 12, 2020	11.7.11	February 2, 2026	64-bit Intel and ARM (Note: 64-bit Intel applications are supported on Apple silicon Macs with Rosetta 2. However, Intel-based Macs are unable to run ARM-based applications, such as iOS and iPadOS apps.)		64-bit
macOS 12	Monterey	21	October 25, 2021	12.7.6	July 29, 2024	64-bit Intel and ARM		64-bit
macOS 13	Ventura	22	October 24, 2022	13.7.8	August 20, 2025	64-bit Intel and ARM		64-bit
macOS 14	Sonoma	23	September 26, 2023	14.8.9	August 6, 2026	64-bit Intel and ARM		64-bit
macOS 15	Sequoia	24	September 16, 2024	15.8.2	October 26, 2026	64-bit Intel and ARM		64-bit
macOS 26	Tahoe	25	September 15, 2025	26.7.2	October 26, 2026	64-bit Intel and ARM		64-bit
macOS 27	Golden Gate	27	September 14, 2026	27.2	October 26, 2026	64-bit ARM	64-bit Intel and ARM (Note: 64-bit Intel applications are supported on Apple silicon Macs with Rosetta 2.)	64-bit
Legend: Unsupported Supported Latest version Preview version

== Releases ==
With the exception of Mac OS X Server 1.0 and the original public beta, the first several macOS versions were named after big cats. Prior to its release, version 10.0 was code named "Cheetah" internally at Apple, and version 10.1 was code named internally as "Puma".

After the code name "Jaguar" for version 10.2 received publicity in the media, Apple began openly using the names to promote the operating system: 10.3 was marketed as "Panther", 10.4 as "Tiger", 10.5 as "Leopard", 10.6 as "Snow Leopard", 10.7 as "Lion", and 10.8 as "Mountain Lion". "Panther", "Tiger", and "Leopard" were registered as trademarks.

Apple registered "Lynx" and "Cougar", but these were allowed to lapse. Apple started using the name of locations in California for subsequent releases: 10.9 Mavericks was named after Mavericks, a popular surfing destination; 10.10 Yosemite was named after Yosemite National Park; 10.11 El Capitan was named for the El Capitan rock formation in Yosemite National Park; 10.12 Sierra was named for the Sierra Nevada mountain range; and 10.13 High Sierra was named for the area around the High Sierra Camps.

In 2016, OS X was renamed to macOS. A few years later, in 2020, with the release of macOS Big Sur, the first component of the version number was incremented from 10 to 11, so Big Sur's initial release's version number was 11.0 instead of 10.16, making the version numbers of macOS behave the way the version numbers of Apple's other operating systems do. All subsequent major releases also increased the first component of the version number.

=== Mac OS X Public Beta ===
On September 13, 2000, Apple released a $29.95 "preview" version of Mac OS X (internally codenamed Kodiak) in order to gain feedback from users. It marked the first public availability of the Aqua interface, and Apple made many changes to the UI based on customer feedback. Mac OS X Public Beta expired and ceased to function on May 14, 2001.

=== Mac OS X 10.0 ===
On March 24, 2001, Apple released Mac OS X 10.0 (internally codenamed Cheetah). The initial version was slow, incomplete, and had very few applications available at the time of its launch, mostly from independent developers. Critics suggested that the operating system was not ready for mainstream adoption, but they recognized the importance of its initial launch as a base to improve upon. Simply releasing Mac OS X was received by the Macintosh community as a great accomplishment, for attempts to completely overhaul the Mac OS had been underway since 1996, and delayed by countless setbacks. Following some bug fixes, kernel panics became much less frequent.

=== Mac OS X 10.1 ===
Mac OS X 10.1 (internally codenamed Puma) was released on September 25, 2001. It has better performance and provided missing features, such as DVD playback. Apple released 10.1 as a free upgrade CD for 10.0 users. Apple released a US$129 upgrade CD for Mac OS 9.

On January 7, 2002, Apple announced that Mac OS X was to be the default operating system for all Macintosh products by the end of that month.

=== Mac OS X 10.2 Jaguar ===
On August 23, 2002, Apple followed up with Mac OS X 10.2 Jaguar, the first release to use its code name as part of the branding. It brought great raw performance improvements, a sleeker look, and many powerful user-interface enhancements (over 150, according to Apple ), including Quartz Extreme for compositing graphics directly on an ATI Radeon or Nvidia GeForce2 MX AGP-based video card with at least 16 MB of VRAM, a system-wide repository for contact information in the new Address Book, and an instant messaging client named iChat. The Happy Mac, which had appeared during the Mac OS startup sequence for almost 18 years, was replaced with a large grey Apple logo with the introduction of Mac OS X 10.2.

=== Mac OS X 10.3 Panther ===
Mac OS X Panther was released on October 24, 2003. In addition to providing much improved performance, it also incorporated the most extensive update yet to the user interface. Panther included as many or more new features as Jaguar had the year before, including an updated Finder, incorporating a brushed-metal interface, Fast user switching, Exposé (Window manager), FileVault, Safari, iChat AV (which added videoconferencing features to iChat), improved Portable Document Format (PDF) rendering and much greater Microsoft Windows interoperability. Support for some early G3 computers such as the Power Macintosh and PowerBook was discontinued.

=== Mac OS X 10.4 Tiger ===
Mac OS X Tiger was released on April 29, 2005. Apple stated that Tiger contained more than 200 new features. As with Panther, certain older machines were no longer supported; Tiger requires a Mac with a built-in FireWire port. Among the new features, Tiger introduced Spotlight, Dashboard, Smart Folders, updated Mail program with Smart Mailboxes, QuickTime 7, Safari 2, Automator, VoiceOver, Core Image and Core Video. The initial release of the Apple TV used a modified version of Tiger with a different graphical interface and fewer applications and services.

On January 10, 2006, Apple released the first Intel x86-based Macs along with the 10.4.4 update to Tiger. This operating system functioned identically on the PowerPC-based Macs and the new Intel-based machines, with the exception of the Intel release dropping support for the Classic environment. 10.4.4 introduced Rosetta, which translated 32-bit PowerPC machine code to 32-bit x86 code, allowing applications for PowerPC to run on Intel-based Macs without modification. Only PowerPC Macs can be booted from retail copies of the Tiger client DVD, but there is a Universal DVD of Tiger Server 10.4.7 (8K1079) that can boot both PowerPC and Intel Macs.

=== Mac OS X 10.5 Leopard ===
Mac OS X Leopard was released on October 26, 2007. Apple called it "the largest update of Mac OS X". Leopard supports both PowerPC- and Intel x86-based Macintosh computers; support for Macs with the G3 processor was dropped, and Macs with the G4 processor required a minimum clock rate of 867 MHz and at least 512 MB of RAM to be installed. The single DVD works for all supported Macs (including 64-bit machines). New features include a new look, an updated Finder, Time Machine, Spaces, Boot Camp pre-installed, full support for 64-bit applications (including graphical applications), new features in Mail and iChat, and a number of new security features.

Leopard, on the Intel platform, is the first Open Brand UNIX 03 registered version of macOS. It was also the first BSD-based OS to receive UNIX 03 certification. Leopard dropped support for the Classic Environment and all Classic applications, and was the final version of Mac OS X to support the PowerPC architecture.

=== Mac OS X 10.6 Snow Leopard ===
Mac OS X Snow Leopard was released on August 28, 2009, and was the last version to be available on an optical disc. Rather than delivering big changes to the appearance and end user functionality like the previous releases of Mac OS X, the development of Snow Leopard was deliberately focused on "under the hood" changes, increasing the performance, efficiency, and stability of the operating system. For most users, the most noticeable changes were a difference in the disk space that the operating system frees up after a clean installation when compared to Mac OS X 10.5 Leopard, a more responsive Finder rewritten in Cocoa, faster Time Machine backups, more reliable and user friendly disk ejects, a more powerful version of the Preview application, and a faster Safari web browser.

An update also introduced support for the Mac App Store, Apple's digital distribution platform for macOS applications and subsequent macOS upgrades. Snow Leopard only supports Macs with Intel CPUs, requires at least 1 GB of RAM, and drops default support for applications built for the PowerPC architecture. Rosetta can be installed as an additional component to retain support for PowerPC-only applications. It is the final version to support 32-bit Intel Macs.

=== Mac OS X 10.7 Lion ===
Mac OS X Lion (also known as OS X Lion) was released on July 20, 2011. It brought developments made in Apple's iOS, such as an easily navigable display of installed applications (Launchpad) and (a greater use of) multi-touch gestures, to the Mac. This release removed Rosetta, making it incapable of running PowerPC applications. It requires 2 GB of memory. Changes made to the graphical user interface (GUI) include the Launchpad (similar to the home screen of iOS and iPadOS devices), auto-hiding scrollbars that only appear when they are being used, and Mission Control, which unifies Exposé, Spaces, Dashboard, and full-screen applications within a single interface. Apple also made changes to applications: they resume in the same state as they were before they were closed (similar to iOS). Documents auto-save by default.

=== OS X 10.8 Mountain Lion ===
OS X Mountain Lion was released on July 25, 2012. It incorporates some features seen in iOS 5, which include Game Center, support for iMessage in the new Messages messaging application, and Reminders as a to-do list app separate from iCal (which is renamed as Calendar, like the iOS app). It also includes support for storing iWork documents in iCloud. 2 GB of memory is required. Application pop-ups are now concentrated on the corner of the screen, and the Center itself is pulled from the right side of the screen. Mountain Lion also includes more Chinese features, including support for Baidu as an option for Safari search engine. Notification Center is added, providing an overview of alerts from applications. It is a desktop version similar to the one in iOS 5.0 and higher. Notes is added, as an application separate from Mail, syncing with its iOS counterpart through the iCloud service. Messages, an instant messaging software application, replaces iChat.

=== OS X 10.9 Mavericks ===
OS X Mavericks was released on October 22, 2013, as a free update through the Mac App Store worldwide. It placed emphasis on battery life, Finder enhancements, other enhancements for power users, and continued iCloud integration, as well as bringing more of Apple's iOS apps to the OS X platform. iBooks and Apple Maps applications were added. Mavericks requires 2 GB of memory to operate. It is the first version named under Apple's then-new theme of places in California, dubbed Mavericks after the surfing location. Unlike previous versions of OS X, which had progressively decreasing prices since 10.6, 10.9 was available at no charge to all users of compatible systems running Snow Leopard (10.6) or later, beginning Apple's policy of free upgrades for life on its operating system and business software.

=== OS X 10.10 Yosemite ===
OS X Yosemite was released to the general public on October 16, 2014, as a free update through the Mac App Store worldwide. It featured a major overhaul of user interface, replaced skeuomorphism with flat graphic design and blurred translucency effects, following the aesthetic introduced with iOS 7. It introduced features called Continuity and Handoff, which allow for tighter integration between paired OS X and iOS devices: the user can handle phone calls or text messages on either their Mac or their iPhone, and edit the same Pages document on either their Mac or their iPad. A later update of the OS included Photos as a replacement for iPhoto and Aperture.

=== OS X 10.11 El Capitan ===
OS X El Capitan was revealed on June 8, 2015, during the WWDC 2015 keynote speech. It was made available as a public beta in July and was made available publicly on September 30, 2015. Apple described this release as containing "Refinements to the Mac Experience" and "Improvements to System Performance" rather than new features. Refinements include public transport built into the Maps application, GUI improvements to the Notes application, as well as adopting San Francisco as the system font. Metal API, an application enhancing software, had debuted in this operating system, being available to "all Macs since 2012".

=== macOS 10.12 Sierra ===
macOS Sierra was announced on June 13, 2016, during the WWDC16 keynote speech. The update brought the Siri assistant to macOS, featuring several Mac-specific features, like searching for files. It also allowed websites to support Apple Pay as a method of transferring payment, using either a nearby iOS device or Touch ID to authenticate. iCloud also received several improvements, such as the ability to store a user's Desktop and Documents folders on iCloud so they could be synced with other Macs on the same Apple ID. It was released publicly on September 20, 2016.

=== macOS 10.13 High Sierra ===
macOS High Sierra was announced on June 5, 2017, during the WWDC17 keynote speech. It was released on September 25, 2017. The release includes many under-the-hood improvements, including a switch to Apple File System (APFS), the introduction of Metal 2, support for HEVC video, and improvements to virtual reality support. In addition, numerous changes were made to standard applications including Photos, Safari, Notes, and Spotlight.

=== macOS 10.14 Mojave ===
macOS Mojave was announced on June 4, 2018, during the WWDC18 keynote speech. It was released on September 24, 2018. Some of the key new features were Dark wallpaper in dark mode, Desktop stacks and Dynamic Desktop, which changes the desktop background image to correspond to the user's current time of day.

=== macOS 10.15 Catalina ===
macOS Catalina was announced on June 3, 2019, during the WWDC19 keynote speech. It was released on October 7, 2019. It primarily focuses on updates to built-in apps, such as replacing iTunes with separate Music, Podcasts, and TV apps, redesigned Reminders and Books apps, and a new Find My app. It also features Sidecar, which allows the user to use an iPad as a second screen for their computer, or even simulate a graphics tablet with an Apple Pencil. It is the first version of macOS not to support 32-bit applications. The Dashboard application was also removed in the update. Since macOS Catalina, iOS apps can run on macOS with Project Catalyst but requires the app to be made compatible unlike ARM-powered Apple silicon Macs that can run all iOS apps by default.

=== macOS 11 Big Sur ===
macOS Big Sur was announced on June 22, 2020, during the WWDC20 keynote speech. It was released November 12, 2020. The major version number is changed, for the first time since "Mac OS X" was released, making it macOS 11. It brings ARM support, new icons, GUI changes to the system, and other bug fixes. Since macOS 11.2.3, it is no longer possible to install iOS apps by default from an IPA file instead of the Mac App Store on Apple silicon Macs, which now requires third-party software to unlock the functionality. Big Sur introduced Rosetta 2 to allow 64-bit Intel applications to run on Apple silicon Macs. Intel-based Macs are unable to run ARM-based applications, including iOS and iPadOS apps.

=== macOS 12 Monterey ===
macOS Monterey was announced on June 7, 2021, during the WWDC21 keynote speech. It was released on October 25, 2021. macOS Monterey introduces new features such as Universal Control, which allows users to use a single keyboard and mouse to move between devices; AirPlay, which now allows users to present and share almost anything; the Shortcuts app, also introduced to macOS, gives users access to galleries of pre-built shortcuts, designed for Macs, a service brought from iOS, and users can now also set up shortcuts, among other things. macOS Monterey is the final version of macOS that officially supports macOS Server.

=== macOS 13 Ventura ===
macOS Ventura was announced on June 6, 2022, during the WWDC22 keynote speech. It was released on October 24, 2022. macOS Ventura introduces Stage Manager, a new and optional window manager, a redesigned settings app, and Continuity Camera, which is a program that allows Mac users to use their iPhone as a camera, and several other new features. It is also the first version of macOS without macOS Server support.

=== macOS 14 Sonoma ===
macOS Sonoma was announced on June 5, 2023, during the WWDC23 keynote speech. Key changes include a revamp of Widgets, the user lock screen, and a video wallpaper/screensaver feature using Apple TV's screen saver videos. It was released on September 26, 2023.

=== macOS 15 Sequoia ===
macOS Sequoia was announced on June 10, 2024, during the WWDC24 keynote speech. This release introduced Apple Intelligence, with a limited initial feature set focused on basic writing and image generation tools complemented by ChatGPT integration. An iPhone Mirroring app for remotely controlling a user's iPhone was included, along with a password manager app, system support for tiling and resizing windows, and various other minor updates to Safari, Maps, Messages and Notes. It was released on September 16, 2024.

=== macOS 26 Tahoe ===
macOS Tahoe was announced on June 9, 2025, during the WWDC25 keynote speech. It introduced a new design language, Liquid Glass, that has been applied universally on all Apple OSes and devices, added new Phone and Games apps, and improved integration with Apple Intelligence. It was released on September 15, 2025. At the conference, Apple announced that it was unifying the version numbers of its operating systems by designating them all with the year after their release, like vehicle model years. Tahoe is the final version of macOS that supports Macs with Intel processors. Successor versions will work only on Macs with Apple silicon systems on a chip (SoCs), and it is the first version of macOS since Mac OS X Snow Leopard that cannot be upgraded from an older version via the Mac App Store; upgrading it is exclusively available through the System Settings software update preference pane, as is the case with iOS.

=== macOS 27 Golden Gate ===
macOS Golden Gate was announced at WWDC26 on June 8, 2026, and was released on September 14, 2026. It includes refinements to the Liquid Glass design language, an LLM-based revision to Siri dubbed "Siri AI," generative AI-based updates to system apps such as Photos, Safari, and Shortcuts, new parental controls, and a focus on bug fixes and performance improvements. It requires an M-Series processor (macOS 27 does not support Intel processors).

== Timeline of Macintosh operating systems ==
Timeline of Mac operating systems

== See also ==
- Architecture of macOS
- iOS version history
- List of built-in macOS apps
- Mac operating systems
