= Apple Developer (app) =

iOS app for software developers

- Apple Developer app on an iPhone
- Developer: Apple
- Stable release: 11.0 / April 11, 2026; 4 months ago
- Operating system: iOS 18 or later; iPadOS 18 or later; macOS 15 or later; tvOS 26 or later; visionOS 26 or later
- Available in: 7 languages
- List of languages English, French, Japanese, Korean, Portuguese, Simplified Chinese, Spanish
- Type: Developer (software)
- License: Proprietary
- Website: apps.apple.com/us/app/apple-developer/id640199958

Apple Developer (formerly WWDC) is an application developed by Apple for iOS, iPadOS, macOS, tvOS, and visionOS. It is a central hub for software developers to access documentation on creating applications for Apple, watch videos from WWDC, and read developer news.

== History ==
The application was originally released on June 5, 2010 for iPhone OS 3. It was called WWDC10, and was mainly intended for conference attendees to manage their schedules and view keynote locations. In the following years, Apple expanded the app to include videos of the sessions for developers who could not attend the event in person.

In November 2019, the app was renamed as Apple Developer. This moved it from being a tool specifically for the WWDC conference to a year-round educational platform for anyone interested in creating an application for Apple. The update also introduced the "Discover" tab, which let users read news from Apple, and watch videos about software development.

Shortly before WWDC 2020, Apple brought the Developer app to macOS. This made it easier for users to access the WWDC platform, as 2020 was the first year that the conference was online, due to COVID-19.

On May 11, 2026, Apple updated the application to version 11.0, introducing the Liquid Glass design language and a redesigned app icon. This update made the app consistent with the aesthetics of iOS 26 and macOS Tahoe.

== See also ==
- iOS
- Xcode
- Swift (programming language)
