= OpenCore Legacy Patcher =

Software to install macOS on older Intel Macs

OpenCore Legacy Patcher (OCLP)

- Screenshot of OCLP 3.0.0
- Original authors: Mykola Grymalyuk, Dhinak G.
- Developer: Dortania
- Release: December 1, 2020
- Stable release: 2.5.1 / September 19, 2026; 51 days ago
- Written in: Python
- Operating system: macOS
- Available in: English
- License: BSD 3-Clause License
- Website: dortania.github.io/OpenCore-Legacy-Patcher/
- Repository: github.com/dortania/OpenCore-Legacy-Patcher/

OpenCore Legacy Patcher (OCLP) is a free and open-source tool and patch set that allows the installation of newer versions of Apple's macOS operating system on older Mac computers with Intel processors that do not support newer versions of macOS. It supports models manufactured from 2007 onwards. The tool is exclusively aimed at Intel Macs and does not support computers with PowerPC or Apple silicon processors.

OCLP supports the installation and updates of macOS from macOS Big Sur through macOS Sequoia, with macOS Tahoe support currently under beta testing. macOS Golden Gate and above are not supported, as they run exclusively on Apple silicon Macs. The software is available for free via its developers' website.

== Technical details and prerequisites ==
Installing the OCLP application requires at least OS X 10.10 Yosemite and a minimum of 4 GB of RAM. However, significantly more RAM is recommended for smooth system and application performance. Specifically for macOS Sonoma and newer versions, a strict minimum of 3 GB of RAM is required. Systems with 2 GB of RAM cannot install macOS Sonoma or Sequoia, and on Sequoia, booting the system might not even be possible. The installation of Big Sur, Monterey, and Ventura requires at least macOS 10.11 El Capitan, and the installation of Sonoma and Sequoia requires at least macOS 10.13 High Sierra. Users are highly recommended to update their Mac to the latest available native firmware before using the Patcher.

The program does not need to build its own operating system, as it relies entirely on the OpenCore bootloader. It is an open-source alternative to the original macOS bootloader. Within the OpenCore bootloader, OCLP replaces certain components and creates a correspondingly customized OpenCore configuration file. Through this advanced bootloader, OCLP applies the necessary modifications (injections and patches) directly to the system's RAM rather than the disk. Because the interventions are not permanent in the firmware (zero firmware patching), a near-native experience is achieved while unlocking newer features on unsupported hardware, such as Hardware Acceleration, AirDrop, unlocking via Apple Watch, Sidecar, Universal Control, and Night Shift.

OCLP stores a reference network to the replaced components in the RAM. This reference network is rebuilt on every reboot using the respective reference list. Some of the references require root privileges to handle the relevant components. Therefore, a root patch rebuilds the reference network whenever references, components, or hardware change. This root patch must be reinstalled after every OS update, as updates break the macOS system seal. This root patch also restores functionality to devices that are no longer officially supported (e.g., graphics cards, etc.).

=== Updates and Limitations ===
OCLP supports "Over-The-Air" (OTA) updates through the macOS settings. However, it is highly recommended to disable automatic updates (even downloading them) to avoid unpredictable incompatibility errors. For major OS upgrades (e.g., macOS 13 to 14), using a USB is suggested. In case a downgrade is required, macOS does not allow retaining data, therefore erasing the drive and restoring from a backup is mandatory.

Due to the age of the hardware, the following incompatibilities may occur:

- Graphics (Non-Metal): Macs manufactured (mostly) before 2012 that do not support the Metal graphics protocol face issues such as the lack of blur effects and malfunctioning of apps like Maps or Find My in macOS Monterey and later.
- Older processors: The lack of AVX2 instruction support can cause modern applications to crash immediately with an "Illegal Instruction" error.
- iPhone Mirroring: Not supported on OCLP systems, as it requires Apple's T2 security chip.
- Apple Intelligence: Requires the Neural Engine unit (exclusive to Apple Silicon processors).

== macOS Tahoe and Golden Gate ==
Although macOS Tahoe is the last version of macOS that retains support for Intel processors, OCLP does not offer official support for it. The reason is the severe and intractable hardware incompatibilities that arose, such as the inability to read classic USB ports on older machines, incidents of total data loss, and severe unpredictable failures, forcing OCLP developers to ask users to immediately disable automatic updates and avoid installing Tahoe. On March 22, 2026, the developers closed off to new donations, telling users that the development for Tahoe has significantly slowed down, although not ended totally. This is due to many developers having left the team. On October 3, 2026, the Release Candidate 1 for OCLP 3.0.0 was released, adding full graphics acceleration support for macOS Tahoe.

On June 8, 2026, MacOS Golden Gate was announced. In this release, Apple has completely removed support and the core code for the Intel (x86_64) architecture. The operating system transitions exclusively to ARM code (for the M-series chips), and OCLP can no longer adapt to the new versions.

== History ==
OCLP has existed since 2020, starting as a private project by its developers, and follows the Semantic Versioning standard. Since then, it has been developed by Dortania, a group of about 30 amateur developers worldwide. The lead developer was Ukrainian software developer Mykola Grymalyuk, also known as Khronokernel, before he joined Apple's bug bounty team in June 2025. He was succeeded by his friend and co-developer Dhinak G., with whom he founded the OCLP project and released version 0.0.1 on December 1, 2020. Ironically, the prototype of this Mac-only program was created using an HP Elite X2 G1 Windows tablet and an Intel X299 desktop, housed in a Power Mac G5 case. Grymalyuk published a retrospective on OCLP's five-year history.

The foundations of the graphical user interface and the files to be programmed are similar to Collin Mistr's previous dosdude1 OpenCore project. Mistr's patchers made it possible to install the earlier operating systems macOS 10.12 Sierra, 10.13 High Sierra, 10.14 Mojave, and 10.15 Catalina on older Intel Macs that were no longer supported.

The OCLP developers also aim to allow the use of obsolete computers with current operating systems for as long as possible for sustainability reasons. This means that older devices that are not compatible with new operating systems, but still function, do not need to be replaced with new devices due to planned obsolescence.

OCLP supports, for example, macOS Sequoia on 83 different Intel Macs from 2008 to 2019.

== Reception ==
According to a test report in the trade magazine "Mac & i" (issue 2/2023, p. 50, author Leo Becker), OCLP was able to install a current macOS on most of the Macs tested (manufactured between 2012 and 2016).

The community also provides extensive support at the user and developer level, primarily through the official "OpenCore Patcher Paradise" server on the Discord platform for troubleshooting.

== Supported Macs ==
According to the official website (July 17, 2026):

MacBook
Model	Identifier	Notes
MacBook (13-inch, Aluminum, Late 2008)	MacBook5,1	non-Metal GPU (macOS 11+); USB 1.1 (macOS 13+)
MacBook (13-inch, Early 2009) MacBook (13-inch, Mid 2009)	MacBook5,2	non-Metal GPU (macOS 11+); USB 1.1 (macOS 13+); Trackpad gestures are partially broken
MacBook (13-inch, Late 2009)	MacBook6,1	non-Metal GPU (macOS 11+); USB 1.1 (macOS 13+)
MacBook (13-inch, Mid 2010)	MacBook7,1	non-Metal GPU (macOS 11+); USB 1.1 (macOS 13+)
MacBook (Retina, 12-inch, Early 2015)	MacBook8,1	non-Metal GPU (macOS 11+)
MacBook (Retina, 12-inch, Early 2016)	MacBook9,1	non-Metal GPU (macOS 11+)
MacBook (Retina, 12-inch, 2017)	MacBook10,1	Native graphics support
MacBook Air
Model	Identifier	Notes
MacBook Air (13-inch, Late 2008) MacBook Air (13-inch, Mid 2009)	MacBookAir2,1	non-Metal GPU (macOS 11+); USB 1.1 (macOS 13+)
MacBook Air (11-inch, Late 2010)	MacBookAir3,1	non-Metal GPU (macOS 11+); USB 1.1 (macOS 13+)
MacBook Air (13-inch, Late 2010)	MacBookAir3,2	non-Metal GPU (macOS 11+); USB 1.1 (macOS 13+)
MacBook Air (11-inch, Mid 2011)	MacBookAir4,1	non-Metal GPU (macOS 11+); USB 1.1 (macOS 13+)
MacBook Air (13-inch, Mid 2011)	MacBookAir4,2	non-Metal GPU (macOS 11+); USB 1.1 (macOS 13+)
MacBook Air (11-inch, Mid 2012)	MacBookAir5,1	Legacy Metal (macOS 13+)
MacBook Air (13-inch, Mid 2012)	MacBookAir5,2	Legacy Metal (macOS 13+)
MacBook Air (11-inch, Mid 2013) MacBook Air (11-inch, Early 2014)	MacBookAir6,1	Legacy Metal (macOS 13+)
MacBook Air (13-inch, Mid 2013) MacBook Air (13-inch, Early 2014)	MacBookAir6,2	Legacy Metal (macOS 13+)
MacBook Air (11-inch, Early 2015)	MacBookAir7,1	Legacy Metal (macOS 13+)
MacBook Air (13-inch, Early 2015) MacBook Air (13-inch, 2017)	MacBookAir7,2	Legacy Metal (macOS 13+)
MacBook Air (Retina, 13-inch, 2018)	MacBookAir8,1	Supported natively up to Sonoma; Currently not supported with OpenCore due to T2 issues
MacBook Air (Retina, 13-inch, 2019)	MacBookAir8,2	Supported natively up to Sonoma; Currently not supported with OpenCore due to T2 issues
MacBook Air (Retina, 13-inch, 2020)	MacBookAir9,1	Supported by Apple
MacBook Pro
Model	Identifier	Notes
MacBook Pro (15-inch, Early 2008) MacBook Pro (17-inch, Early 2008)	MacBookPro4,1	non-Metal GPU (macOS 11+); USB 1.1 (macOS 13+)
MacBook Pro (15-inch, Late 2008) MacBook Pro (15-inch, Early 2009)	MacBookPro5,1	non-Metal GPU (macOS 11+); USB 1.1 (macOS 13+)
MacBook Pro (17-inch, Early 2009) MacBook Pro (17-inch, Mid 2009)	MacBookPro5,2	non-Metal GPU (macOS 11+); USB 1.1 (macOS 13+)
MacBook Pro (15-inch, Mid 2009)	MacBookPro5,3 MacBookPro5,4	non-Metal GPU (macOS 11+); USB 1.1 (macOS 13+)
MacBook Pro (13-inch, Mid 2009)	MacBookPro5,5	non-Metal GPU (macOS 11+); USB 1.1 (macOS 13+)
MacBook Pro (17-inch, Mid 2010)	MacBookPro6,1	non-Metal GPU (macOS 11+)
MacBook Pro (15-inch, Mid 2010)	MacBookPro6,2	non-Metal GPU (macOS 11+)
MacBook Pro (13-inch, Mid 2010)	MacBookPro7,1	non-Metal GPU (macOS 11+); USB 1.1 (macOS 13+)
MacBook Pro (13-inch, Early 2011) MacBook Pro (13-inch, Late 2011)	MacBookPro8,1	non-Metal GPU (macOS 11+)
MacBook Pro (15-inch, Early 2011) MacBook Pro (15-inch, Late 2011)	MacBookPro8,2	non-Metal GPU (macOS 11+)
MacBook Pro (17-inch, Early 2011)	MacBookPro8,3	non-Metal GPU (macOS 11+)
MacBook Pro (15-inch, Mid 2012)	MacBookPro9,1	Legacy Metal (macOS 13+)
MacBook Pro (13-inch, Mid 2012)	MacBookPro9,2	Legacy Metal (macOS 13+)
MacBook Pro (Retina, 15-inch, Mid 2012) MacBook Pro (Retina, 15-inch, Early 2013)	MacBookPro10,1	Legacy Metal (macOS 13+)
MacBook Pro (Retina, 13-inch, Late 2012) MacBook Pro (Retina, 13-inch, Early 2013)	MacBookPro10,2	Legacy Metal (macOS 13+)
MacBook Pro (Retina, 13-inch, Late 2013) MacBook Pro (Retina, 13-inch, Mid 2014)	MacBookPro11,1	Legacy Metal (macOS 13+)
MacBook Pro (Retina, 15-inch, Late 2013) MacBook Pro (Retina, 15-inch, Mid 2014)	MacBookPro11,2 MacBookPro11,3	Legacy Metal (macOS 13+)
MacBook Pro (Retina, 15-inch, Mid 2015)	MacBookPro11,4 MacBookPro11,5	Legacy Metal (macOS 13+)
MacBook Pro (Retina, 13-inch, Early 2015)	MacBookPro12,1	Legacy Metal (macOS 13+)
MacBook Pro (13-inch, 2016, 2 Thunderbolt 3 ports)	MacBookPro13,1	Legacy Metal (macOS 13+)
MacBook Pro (13-inch, 2016, 4 Thunderbolt 3 ports)	MacBookPro13,2	Legacy Metal (macOS 13+)
MacBook Pro (15-inch, 2016)	MacBookPro13,3	Legacy Metal (macOS 13+)
MacBook Pro (13-inch, 2017, 2 Thunderbolt 3 ports)	MacBookPro14,1	Native graphics support
MacBook Pro (13-inch, 2017, 4 Thunderbolt 3 ports)	MacBookPro14,2	Native graphics support
MacBook Pro (15-inch, 2017)	MacBookPro14,3	Legacy Metal (macOS 14+)
MacBook Pro (13-inch, 2018, 4 Thunderbolt 3 ports) MacBook Pro (13-inch, 2019, 4 Thunderbolt 3 ports)	MacBookPro15,2	Supported by Apple
MacBook Pro (15-inch, 2018) MacBook Pro (15-inch, 2019)	MacBookPro15,1 MacBookPro15,3	Supported by Apple
MacBook Pro (13-inch, 2019, 2 Thunderbolt 3 ports)	MacBookPro15,4	Supported by Apple
MacBook Pro (16-inch, 2019)	MacBookPro16,1 MacBookPro16,4	Supported by Apple
MacBook Pro (13-inch, 2020, 4 Thunderbolt 3 ports)	MacBookPro16,2	Supported by Apple
MacBook Pro (13-inch, 2020, 2 Thunderbolt 3 ports)	MacBookPro16,3	Supported by Apple
Mac mini
Model	Identifier	Notes
Mac mini (Early 2009)	Macmini3,1	non-Metal GPU (macOS 11+); USB 1.1 (macOS 13+)
Mac mini (Mid 2010)	Macmini4,1	non-Metal GPU (macOS 11+); USB 1.1 (macOS 13+)
Mac mini (Mid 2011)	Macmini5,1 Macmini5,2 Macmini5,3	non-Metal GPU (macOS 11+)
Mac mini (Late 2012)	Macmini6,1 Macmini6,2	Legacy Metal (macOS 13+)
Mac mini (Late 2014)	Macmini7,1	Legacy Metal (macOS 13+)
Mac mini (Late 2018)	Macmini8,1	Supported by Apple
iMac
Model	Identifier	Notes
iMac (20-inch, Mid 2007) iMac (24-inch, Mid 2007)	iMac7,1	Requires SSE4.1 CPU; non-Metal GPU (macOS 11+); USB 1.1 (macOS 13+); Remove stock Bluetooth to prevent panics
iMac (20-inch, Early 2008) iMac (24-inch, Early 2008)	iMac8,1	non-Metal GPU (macOS 11+); USB 1.1 (macOS 13+)
iMac (20-inch, Early 2009) iMac (24-inch, Early 2009) iMac (20-inch, Mid 2009)	iMac9,1	non-Metal GPU (macOS 11+); USB 1.1 (macOS 13+); Recommend upgrading to Metal GPU
iMac (21.5-inch, Late 2009) iMac (27-inch, Late 2009)	iMac10,1	non-Metal GPU (macOS 11+); USB 1.1 (macOS 13+); Recommend upgrading to Metal GPU
iMac (27-inch, Late 2009)	iMac11,1	non-Metal GPU (macOS 11+); USB 1.1 (macOS 13+); Recommend upgrading to Metal GPU
iMac (21.5-inch, Mid 2010)	iMac11,2	non-Metal GPU (macOS 11+); USB 1.1 (macOS 13+); Recommend upgrading to Metal GPU
iMac (27-inch, Mid 2010)	iMac11,3	non-Metal GPU (macOS 11+); USB 1.1 (macOS 13+); Recommend upgrading to Metal GPU
iMac (21.5-inch, Mid 2011) iMac (21.5-inch, Late 2011)	iMac12,1	non-Metal GPU (macOS 11+); USB 1.1 (macOS 13+); Recommend upgrading to Metal GPU
iMac (27-inch, Mid 2011)	iMac12,2	non-Metal GPU (macOS 11+); USB 1.1 (macOS 13+); Recommend upgrading to Metal GPU
iMac (21.5-inch, Late 2012)	iMac13,1	Legacy Metal (macOS 13+)
iMac (27-inch, Late 2012)	iMac13,2	Legacy Metal (macOS 13+)
iMac (21.5-inch, Early 2013)	iMac13,3	Legacy Metal (macOS 13+)
iMac (21.5-inch, Late 2013)	iMac14,1	Legacy Metal (macOS 13+)
iMac (27-inch, Late 2013)	iMac14,2 iMac14,3	Legacy Metal (macOS 13+)
iMac (21.5-inch, Mid 2014)	iMac14,4	Legacy Metal (macOS 13+)
iMac (Retina 5K, 27-inch, Late 2014) iMac (Retina 5K, 27-inch, Mid 2015)	iMac15,1	Legacy Metal (macOS 13+)
iMac (21.5-inch, Late 2015)	iMac16,1	Legacy Metal (macOS 13+)
iMac (Retina 4K, 21.5-inch, Late 2015)	iMac16,2	Legacy Metal (macOS 13+)
iMac (Retina 5K, 27-inch, Late 2015)	iMac17,1	Legacy Metal (macOS 13+)
iMac (21.5-inch, 2017)	iMac18,1	Native graphics support
iMac (Retina 4K, 21.5-inch, 2017)	iMac18,2	Native graphics support
iMac (Retina 5K, 27-inch, 2017)	iMac18,3	Native graphics support
iMac (Retina 5K, 27-inch, 2019)	iMac19,1	Supported by Apple
iMac (Retina 4K, 21.5-inch, 2019)	iMac19,2	Supported by Apple
iMac (Retina 5K, 27-inch, 2020)	iMac20,1 iMac20,2	Supported by Apple
iMac Pro (2017)	iMacPro1,1	Supported by Apple
Mac Pro
Model	Identifier	Notes
Mac Pro (Early 2008)	MacPro3,1	Recommend upgrade to Metal GPU; non-Metal GPU (macOS 11+); USB 1.1 (macOS 13+); Remove stock Bluetooth to prevent panics
Mac Pro (Early 2009)	MacPro4,1	Recommend upgrade to Metal GPU; non-Metal GPU (macOS 11+); USB 1.1 (macOS 13+)
Mac Pro (Mid 2010) Mac Pro (Mid 2012)	MacPro5,1	Recommend upgrade to Metal GPU; non-Metal GPU (macOS 11+); USB 1.1 (macOS 13+)
Mac Pro (Late 2013)	MacPro6,1	Legacy Metal (macOS 13+)
Mac Pro (2019)	MacPro7,1	Supported by Apple
Xserve
Model	Identifier	Notes
Xserve (Early 2008)	Xserve2,1	Recommend upgrade to Metal GPU; non-Metal GPU (macOS 11+); USB 1.1 (macOS 13+)
Xserve (Early 2009)	Xserve3,1	Recommend upgrade to Metal GPU; non-Metal GPU (macOS 11+); USB 1.1 (macOS 13+)
