= MacOS Sonoma =

2023 operating system version

macOS Sonoma
- Version of the macOS operating system

- Screenshot of macOS Sonoma
- Developer: Apple
- OS family: Mac; Unix, based on Darwin (BSD)
- Working state: No longer supported
- Source model: Closed, with open-source components
- General availability: September 26, 2023; 3 years ago
- Latest release: 14.8.9 (August 6, 2026; 3 months ago) [±]
- Update method: Software Update
- Supported platforms: x86-64, ARM64
- Kernel type: Hybrid (XNU)
- License: Proprietary software with open-source components and content licensed with APSL
- Preceded by: macOS Ventura
- Succeeded by: macOS Sequoia
- Official website: MacOS Sonoma (archived at Wayback Machine)
- Tagline: Come for the power. Stay for the fun.

Support status
- Unsupported as of August 17, 2026.

macOS Sonoma (version 14) is the twentieth major release of macOS, Apple's operating system for Mac computers. The successor to macOS Ventura, it was announced at WWDC 2023 on June 5, 2023, and released on September 26, 2023. It is named after the wine region located in Sonoma County, California.

macOS Sonoma was succeeded by macOS Sequoia on September 16, 2024.

The first developer beta was released on June 5, 2023, and macOS Sonoma entered public beta on July 11, 2023.

Sonoma is the final version of macOS that supports the 2018–2019 MacBook Air, as its successor, macOS Sequoia, drops support for those models.

== New features ==
macOS Sonoma includes a number of new features and improvements, mainly focused on productivity and creativity:

- Widgets have been revamped. They are no longer constrained to the Notification Center—instead they can be placed anywhere on the desktop, and the widget picker has been redesigned to resemble the iOS and iPadOS versions of it.
- The lock screen has been redesigned to include a date and time similar to iOS and iPadOS. The power buttons have become a context menu.
- Video-conferencing apps can overlay the presenter's webcam video on top of screen sharing.
- App icons have been made more rounded.
- The Spotlight search bar has been made more rounded, and its width has been decreased.
- Safari changes:
  - Browsing profiles enable separate sets of bookmarks, extensions, and cookies, which can be used to separate, for example, a personal setup from a work one.
  - Password sharing lets multiple people have access to the same collection of website passwords, and update them as needed, with changes syncing across all enrolled devices.
  - Safari web apps let the user add any website to the Dock and open it in a simplified Safari interface, in a way that is similar to both web apps introduced in iPhone OS 1.1.3 and Google Chrome. This feature is slightly different from progressive web apps since it does not require additional work from website developers.
- Messages changes:
  - More precise search filters: for example, the contact name can be combined with a search term to look for the term within a specific conversation.
  - Catch-up lets the user quickly jump to the first unread message in a conversation.
  - Tapback now appears as multiple icons instead of being a context menu.
  - iMessage stickers have a new selection interface.
- Apple TV now has a sidebar instead of a top bar.
- Game mode optimizes gaming performance by prioritizing gaming tasks and allocating more GPU and CPU capacity to the game. It provides smoother frame rates for game play and reduced latency for Bluetooth peripherals, such as wireless game controllers and AirPods.
- New slow-motion screensavers of different locations worldwide. When logged in, they gradually slow down and become the desktop wallpaper.
- Smoother animations for several areas such as the notification panel, the lock screen, and the show desktop gesture. The notifications now slide in with an ease-out motion, the lock screen now zooms in and out when unlocking and locking, the show desktop gesture has a new spring back animation.
- Users can react with their hands and animations will pop up based on the hand gesture.
- AV1 video is supported in Quick Look and QuickTime on Macs with an M3 chip or later.
- Print Center, a utility application returning from Mac OS X Tiger, was reintroduced for managing print jobs, viewing different printer queues, and pausing or deleting print jobs.
- The text cursor now looks more like its iOS counterpart. It is bolder, has a smooth blinking motion, and its color follows the current app's accent color. It also briefly displays an indicator that shows the current input language when the user switches keyboard languages. This indicator can also signal helpful input details like when Caps Lock is on.
- Videos now encode faster in Final Cut Pro, Compressor, and third-party video applications on Mac computers using M1 Ultra or M2 Ultra.
- The startup screen is now slightly different, with the loading bar at the bottom being lowered to the bottom of the screen instead of immediately under the Apple logo.
- The Screen Sharing app adds a new high performance mode providing low-latency audio, high frame rates, HDR, and supports up to two virtual displays.
- Apple Maps on Intel GPUs only renders the map in 30 Hz when Location Services is turned off.

=== Gaming ===
Alongside macOS Sonoma, Apple announced developer tools for porting Windows games to macOS. The Game Porting Toolkit (GPTK), derived from Wine and CrossOver and released in beta, translates Windows application programming interface (API) calls to equivalent macOS APIs, allowing developers to run unmodified versions of their x86 Windows DirectX games on macOS. Mac users have been able to use the Game Porting Toolkit to run a number of DirectX 12 games; tech news outlets have compared the tool to Valve Corporation's Proton compatibility layer for Linux. Apple also released a Metal Shader Converter that converts shaders to Apple's Metal graphics API.

A DigitalFoundry review of the first beta of Game Porting Toolkit found it "impressive", with few graphical glitches and full support for console controllers instead of the keyboard, though they found that frame rates were around half of what they would be on Windows, and that many games were not supported. During the Sonoma beta, updates to the Game Porting Toolkit brought support for 32-bit games and around 20% better performance.

Writing for AppleInsider and iMore, reporter Peter Cohen said that Game Mode and the Game Porting Toolkit are improvements but do not indicate the kind of "sea change" in Apple's priorities and culture that is needed to build a true Mac gaming ecosystem. Cohen says that the problem with Mac gaming is not in the ability to port games, but in a lack of a "business case" for game publishers to do so, due to the Mac's low market share, the cost of supporting a port, and uncertain demand for Mac games when many Mac users also own consoles or gaming PCs. YouTuber Snazzy Labs issued similar criticisms, which journalist John Siracusa agreed with.

=== New Unicode characters font support ===
==== macOS 14.0 ====
- Tagalog Letter Ra (U+170D) (14.0)
- Tagalog Sign Pamudpod (U+1715) (14.0)
- Tagalog Letter Archaic Ra (U+171F) (14.0)

=== Removed features ===
- Support for legacy Mail plug-ins has been removed.
- System API support for converting PostScript and Encapsulated PostScript files to PDF format has been removed, following previous changes in macOS Ventura that removed support for viewing and converting PostScript and Encapsulated PostScript files within Preview.

== Supported hardware ==
macOS Sonoma supports all Mac models with Apple silicon and Macs with Intel's Xeon W and eighth-generation Coffee Lake or Amber Lake and newer chips. It drops support for various models released in 2017, officially marking the end of support for Macs without Retina display, and the 12-inch MacBook. The 2019 iMac is the only Sonoma-supported Intel Mac that lacks a T2 chip.

macOS Sonoma supports the following Mac models:

- iMac (2019 or later)
- iMac Pro (2017)
- MacBook Air (2018 or later)
- MacBook Pro (2018 or later)
- Mac Mini (2018 or later)
- Mac Pro (2019 or later)
- Mac Studio (2022 or later)

According to an Ars Technica analysis, 2016 and 2017 Macs received on average six years of updates, which is lower than the seven to eight years of updates received by Intel Macs released from 2009 to 2015.

=== Unofficial support ===
Community-driven tools such as OpenCore Legacy Patcher enable the installation of macOS Sonoma on earlier hardware models that are no longer officially supported by Apple. Such models date back to the 2008 MacBook Pro and 2007 iMac.

== Release history ==
The first developer beta of macOS Sonoma was released on Monday, June 5, 2023. The Sonoma developer beta was the first to be available to anyone with a free Apple Developer account, without needing a developer subscription. The full release was released on September 26, 2023.

macOS Sonoma releases
Version	Build	Release date	Darwin version
14.0	23A344	September 26, 2023	23.0.0 xnu-10002.1.13~1 Fri Sep 15 14:41:34 PDT 2023
14.1	23B74	October 25, 2023	23.1.0 xnu-10002.41.9~6 Mon Oct 9 21:27:27 PDT 2023
14.1.1	23B81	November 7, 2023	23.1.0 xnu-10002.41.9~6 Mon Oct 9 21:26:29 PDT 2023
14.1.1	23B2082	November 7, 2023	23.1.0 xnu-10002.41.9~6 Mon Oct 9 21:26:29 PDT 2023
14.1.2	23B92	November 30, 2023	23.1.0 xnu-10002.41.9~6 Mon Oct 9 21:27:27 PDT 2023
14.1.2	23B2091	November 30, 2023	23.1.0 xnu-10002.41.9~6 Mon Oct 9 21:27:27 PDT 2023
14.2	23C64	December 11, 2023	23.2.0 xnu-10002.61.3~2 Wed Nov 15 21:54:10 PST 2023
14.2.1	23C71	December 19, 2023	23.2.0 xnu-10002.61.3~2 Wed Nov 15 21:54:10 PST 2023
14.3	23D56	January 22, 2024	23.3.0 xnu-10002.81.5~7 Wed Dec 20 21:30:27 PST 2023
14.3.1	23D60	February 8, 2024	23.3.0 xnu-10002.81.5~7 Wed Dec 20 21:28:58 PST 2023
14.4	23E214	March 7, 2024	23.4.0 xnu-10063.101.15~2 Wed Feb 21 21:44:31 PST 2024
14.4.1	23E224	March 25, 2024	23.4.0 xnu-10063.101.17~1 Fri Mar 15 00:12:41 PDT 2024
14.5	23F79	May 13, 2024	23.5.0 xnu-10063.121.3~5 Wed May 1 20:16:51 PDT 2024
14.6	23G80	July 29, 2024	23.6.0 xnu-10063.141.1~2 Fri Jul 5 18:01:46 PDT 2024
14.6.1	23G93	August 7, 2024	23.6.0 xnu-10063.141.1~2 Mon Jul 29 21:13:04 PDT 2024
14.7	23H124	September 16, 2024	23.6.0 xnu-10063.141.1.700.5~1 Wed Jul 31 20:48:44 PDT 2024
14.7.1	23H222	October 28, 2024	23.6.0 xnu-10063.141.1.701.1~1 Thu Sep 12 23:34:49 PDT 2024
14.7.2	23H311	December 11, 2024	23.6.0 xnu-10063.141.1.702.7~1 Fri Nov 15 15:12:37 PST 2024
14.7.3	23H417	January 27, 2025	23.6.0 xnu-10063.141.1.703.2~1 Thu Dec 19 20:44:10 PST 2024
14.7.4	23H420	February 10, 2025	23.6.0 xnu-10063.141.1.703.2~1 Thu Dec 19 20:44:50 PST 2024
14.7.5	23H527	March 31, 2025	23.6.0 xnu-10063.141.1.704.6~1 Thu Mar 6 22:00:07 PST 2025
14.7.6	23H626	May 12, 2025	23.6.0 xnu-10063.141.1.705.2~1 Thu Apr 24 20:29:27 PDT 2025
14.7.7	23H723	July 29, 2025	23.6.0 xnu-10063.141.1.705.2~2 Wed May 14 13:52:32 PDT 2025
14.7.8	23H730	August 20, 2025	23.6.0 xnu-10063.141.1.705.2~2 Wed May 14 13:52:32 PDT 2025
14.8	23J21	September 15, 2025	23.6.0 xnu-10063.141.1.706.13~1 Mon Aug 11 21:19:08 PDT 2025
14.8.1	23J30	September 29, 2025	23.6.0 xnu-10063.141.1.706.13~1 Mon Aug 11 21:19:08 PDT 2025
14.8.2	23J126	November 3, 2025	23.6.0 xnu-10063.141.1.707.11~1 Wed Oct 15 21:14:01 PDT 2025
14.8.3	23J220	December 12, 2025	23.6.0 xnu-10063.141.1.708.2~1 Wed Nov 5 21:49:21 PST 2025
14.8.4	23J319	February 11, 2026	23.6.0 xnu-10063.141.1.710.3~1 Mon Jan 19 22:02:22 PST 2026
14.8.5	23J423	March 24, 2026	23.6.0 xnu-10063.141.1.711.7~1 Tue Feb 24 20:51:44 PST 2026
14.8.7	23J520	May 11, 2026	23.6.0 xnu-10063.141.1.712.16~1 Tue Apr 21 20:19:36 PDT 2026
14.8.8	23J620	July 27, 2026	23.6.0 xnu-10063.141.1.713.39~1 Tue Jul 21 21:56:37 PDT 2026
14.8.9	23J631	August 6, 2026	23.6.0 xnu-10063.141.1.713.39~1 Tue Jul 21 21:56:37 PDT 2026

See Apple's official release notes, and official security update contents.

== Timeline of Mac operating systems ==
Timeline of Mac operating systems

== See also ==
- iOS 17
- iPadOS 17
- tvOS 17
- watchOS 10
- visionOS 1

Preceded by macOS 13 Ventura	macOS 14 Sonoma; 2023	Succeeded by macOS 15 Sequoia
