= Freeform (Apple) =

Whiteboard software developed by Apple

- App icon (dark mode) since iOS 26.4

- Screenshot of Freeform on an iPhone 14 Pro running iOS 27
- Developer: Apple Inc.
- Release: December 13, 2022; 3 years ago
- Operating system: macOS 13.1 or later; iOS 16.2 or later; iPadOS 16.2 or later; visionOS 1.0 or later
- Type: Whiteboarding
- License: Proprietary

Freeform is a digital whiteboarding application developed by Apple for macOS, iOS, iPadOS, and visionOS devices, first revealed during the 2022 Worldwide Developers Conference, and officially launched on December 13, 2022, alongside iOS 16.2, iPadOS 16.2, and macOS 13.1. It allows users to create infinitely scaling canvases called "boards", which can display a range of inputs including text notes, photos, documents, and web links. There are also a variety of pen and brush tools available on the iOS and iPadOS versions of the software, letting users add sketches or handwriting to their boards similar to the tools available in the Notes app, which are compatible with the Apple Pencil.

The app is designed to encourage brainstorming and enable real-time collaboration between users, with support for FaceTime and iCloud syncing.

Freeform was added into the Apple Creator Studio subscription in March 2026, joining nine additional apps in the bundle, with Freeform gaining additional subscription-exclusive features and a new app icon.

== Version history ==
Version number	Release date	Changes
1.0	December 13, 2022	Initial release.

== See also ==
- Interactive whiteboard
- Microsoft Whiteboard
- Google Jamboard
