= MacOS Tahoe =

2025 operating system version

macOS Tahoe
- Version of the macOS operating system

- Desktop screenshot of macOS Tahoe
- Developer: Apple
- OS family: Mac; Unix, based on Darwin (BSD)
- Working state: Current
- Source model: Closed, with open source components
- General availability: September 15, 2025; 13 months ago
- Latest release: 26.7.3 (November 9, 2026; 1 day ago) [±]
- Available in: 42 languages
- Update method: Software Update
- Supported platforms: ARM64 (Apple silicon) x86-64 (Intel)
- Kernel type: Hybrid (XNU)
- License: Proprietary software with open-source components and content licensed with APSL
- Preceded by: macOS Sequoia
- Succeeded by: macOS Golden Gate
- Official website: MacOS Tahoe (archived at Wayback Machine)
- Tagline: Fresh faced. Timelessly Mac.

Support status
- Receiving Safari and OS security updates.

Articles in the series

macOS Tahoe (version 26) (Note: Apple advanced the version number to 26, succeeding macOS Sequoia (version 15), as part of a shift to a year-based versioning convention across its operating systems.) is the twenty-second major release of Apple's macOS operating system. The successor to macOS Sequoia, it was announced at WWDC 2025 on June 9, 2025, and its first developer beta was released the same day. It was released on September 15, 2025.

It was succeeded by macOS Golden Gate on September 14, 2026.

Tahoe is the final version of macOS that supports x86-64-based Macs with Intel processors – the 2020 iMac, the 2019 16-inch MacBook Pro, the 2020 four-port 13-inch MacBook Pro, and the 2019 Mac Pro models – as its successor, macOS Golden Gate, only works on Macs with Apple silicon systems on a chip (SoCs). It is the first version of macOS since Mac OS X Snow Leopard that cannot be upgraded from an older version via the Mac App Store; upgrading it is exclusively available through the System Settings software update preference pane, as is the case with iOS and iPadOS.

== Development ==
macOS Tahoe was announced by Apple's senior vice president of software engineering Craig Federighi at the Worldwide Developers Conference (WWDC) on June 9, 2025. The first developer beta was released the same day.

At the conference, Apple announced that it was unifying the version numbers of its operating systems by designating them all with the year after their release, like vehicle model years. Federighi said that macOS versions will still primarily be marketed using release names: macOS 26 is named "Tahoe" (after Lake Tahoe, a lake that straddles the border of California and Nevada), continuing Apple's current practice of naming macOS releases after locations in California, which began with OS X Mavericks.

== Features ==
Apple said that macOS Tahoe introduces several features and improvements, mainly focused on the user interface.

=== System features ===
==== User interface ====
The user interface has been substantially redesigned for the first time since macOS Big Sur in 2020, now using the Liquid Glass design language to align with iOS 26 and iPadOS 26.

==== Desktop, Lock Screen, and Control Center ====
- Folder icons have been redesigned and can now have custom colors, emblems, and emojis, and can also abide by the accent color. They also now have animations.
- App icons have been unified with iOS and iPadOS, and can have dark and tinted variants as introduced with iOS 18 and iPadOS 18, as well as a new clear variant.
- The menu bar is now fully transparent by default, with a faint drop shadow. The option to show a background for the menu bar is retained.
- The Control Center has been redesigned, now functioning like and resembling the iOS version introduced in iOS 18 and iPadOS 18.
- Volume and brightness sliders have been redesigned; the sliders are now fully integrated with the Control Center.
- Some Lock Screen customization features on iOS and iPadOS have been brought over to the Mac, such as changing the font and weight of the clock.

==== Spotlight ====
- Spotlight Search has been redesigned and gains quick actions, "quick-key" shortcuts, third-party API support, a completely revamped indexer with AI support, menubar search, and Apple Intelligence integration.
- An Applications feature which is similar to the App Library, used on iOS since iOS 14 and iPadOS since iPadOS 15. It is integrated into the Spotlight interface. iPhone apps also appear in the Applications list through Continuity from the user's iPhone, and will launch through iPhone Mirroring. This replaces Launchpad from the previous versions of macOS.

==== Other new features ====
- App icons are now required to be squared-circles (squircles), a design recommended since macOS Big Sur; an icon that does not comply with the requirement is placed inside a gray squircle.
- Areas such as the Control Center, app opening, and Spotlight Search now have increased animation.
- Many iOS and iPadOS features have been brought over to the Mac, such as Live Activities and Collections in the Photos app.
- The cursor has been redesigned, now having a more rounded appearance.
- Vehicle Motion Cues, a system-wide Accessibility Reader, and support for Braille displays come as part of expanded accessibility features.
- The Photos, Maps, and Apple Music apps now behave more similarly to their iOS and iPadOS counterparts.
- Notifications for low battery and AirPods have been reduced to alerts in their menu bar items.
- The power and restart windows are now shown in a pop-up window rather than an actual one.
- Terminal gains support for 24-bit color and Powerline fonts.
- Passwords adds a password history feature to view previous passwords.
- The disc image format, formerly RAW, has been replaced by the new format Apple Sparse Image Format (ASIF), which Apple claims is significantly faster and more similar to a native SSD's performance.
- The Macintosh HD icon has been changed from a hard disk drive to a solid-state drive.
- NFSv4.1 (RFC 8881) client support has been added.
- The icon for Finder has been changed to align with the Liquid Glass design language.
- macOS 26.2 enables support for the 160 MHz channel for Macs with Wi-Fi 6E.
- macOS 26.4 added a battery charging limit slider.

==== New apps ====
- Phone: the Phone app uses Continuity to integrate with the iPhone.
- Journal: encourages users to create journal entries in which they can record and reflect upon their thoughts and activities.
- Magnifier: the app uses the Mac's camera to allow users to zoom in on information in front of them.
- Games: provides an interface for games from the App Store and Apple Arcade, as well as social features in Game Center.
- Apps: a replacement to Launchpad that was used since Mac OS X Lion. macOS 26.1 changes the number of columns of applications visible from five to seven.

==== Removed features ====
- Home only supports the redesigned architecture introduced with iOS 16 and macOS Ventura and ends support for the older architecture.
- Support for FireWire 400 and 800 has been removed.
- Launchpad has been removed in favor of Apps. Apps removes the ability to customize the layout of applications and create folders.
- Safari no longer had the Compact tab layout in its settings in macOS 26.0 through 26.3.2, but this was added back in macOS 26.4.

== Reception ==
macOS Tahoe has had mixed feedback. The new "Liquid Glass" UI and changes to the user experience has had mixed reception. The new version has been widely criticized for its poorer optimization, and its poorer stability compared to previous versions. The issues include stuttering even on new devices, and graphical issues in the GUI or stock apps like Notes.

== Supported hardware ==
macOS Tahoe supports all Macs with Apple silicon and some of those with Intel's ninth-generation Coffee Lake Refresh, tenth-generation Ice Lake and Comet Lake, and Cascade Lake–based Xeon-W processors. Unofficial installation of macOS Tahoe on non-supported Macs is possible using a compatible patch utility, such as OpenCore Legacy Patcher.

Hardware	CPU	Supports		
Hardware	CPU	macOS Tahoe	Apple Intelligence	Boot Camp
MacBook Neo	A18 Pro	26.3 & later	Yes	No
MacBook Air (M1, 2020 or later)	M-series	Yes	Yes	No
MacBook Pro (13-inch, 2020, four Thunderbolt 3 ports)	Intel	Yes	No	Yes
MacBook Pro (13-inch, 2020 or later)	M-series	Yes	Yes	No
MacBook Pro (16-inch, 2019)	Intel	Yes	No	Yes
MacBook Pro (14- or 16-inch, 2021 or later)	M-series	Yes	Yes	No
Mac Mini (2020 or later)	M-series	Yes	Yes	No
iMac (2020)	Intel	Yes	No	Yes
iMac (2021 or later)	M-series	Yes	Yes	No
Mac Studio (2022 or later)	M-series	Yes	Yes	No
Mac Pro (2019)	Intel	Yes	No	Yes
Mac Pro (2023)	M-series	Yes	Yes	No

During its Platforms State of the Union event at WWDC 2025, Apple announced that macOS Tahoe will be the last major version of macOS that supports Intel-based Macs. The only remaining Intel-based Macs supported by Tahoe are the Mac Pro (2019), the MacBook Pro (16-inch, 2019), the MacBook Pro (13-inch, 2020, four Thunderbolt 3 ports) and the iMac (2020), thus ending support for all Intel-based MacBook Air and Mac Mini models.

== Release history ==
macOS Tahoe releases
Version	Build	Release date	Darwin version
26.0	25A354	September 15, 2025	25.0.0 xnu-12377.1.9~3 Mon August 25, 21:17:54 PDT 2025
26.0	25A8353	October 22, 2025	Preinstalled on the 14-inch M5 MacBook Pro
26.0.1	25A362	September 29, 2025	25.0.0 xnu-12377.1.9~141 Wed September 17, 21:42:08 PDT 2025
26.0.1	25A8364	October 15, 2025	14-inch M5 MacBook Pro only
26.1	25B78	November 3, 2025	25.1.0 xnu-12377.41.6~2 Mon October 20, 19:32:56 PDT 2025
26.2	25C56	December 12, 2025	25.2.0 xnu-12377.61.12~1 Tue Nov 18 22:09:34 PDT 2025
26.3	25D125	February 11, 2026	25.3.0 xnu-12377.81.4~5 Wed Jan 28 21:54:22 PDT 2026
26.3.1	25D2128	March 4, 2026	25.3.0 xnu-12377.91.3~2 Wed Jan 28 20:54:55 PDT 2026
26.3.1 (a)	25D771280a	March 17, 2026	Background Security Improvement
26.3.2	25D2140	March 10, 2026	OTA on MacBook Neo only, available as IPSW/InstallAssistant.pkg for other Macs
26.3.2 (a)	25D771400a	March 17, 2026	Background Security Improvement
26.4	25E246	March 24, 2026	25.4.0 xnu-12377.101.15~1 Thu Mar 19 19:33:09 PDT 2026
26.4.1	25E253	April 9, 2026	Bug fixes
26.5	25F71	May 11, 2026	25.5.0 xnu-12377.121.6~2 Mon Apr 27 20:40:51 PDT 2026
26.5.1	25F80	June 1, 2026	Bug fixes
26.5.2	25F84	June 29, 2026	Bug fixes
26.6	25G72	July 27, 2026	25.6.0 xnu-12377.161.13~4 Sat Jul 11 15:27:02 PDT 2026
26.6.1	25G76	August 6, 2026	25.6.0 xnu-12377.161.13~4 Sat Jul 11 15:27:02 PDT 2026
26.6.2	25G83	August 17, 2026	25.6.0 xnu-12377.161.14~5 Fri Jul 31 19:18:43 PDT 2026
26.7	25G229	September 14, 2026	25.6.0 xnu-12377.161.15.700.19~2 Tue Aug 18 17:46:40 PDT 2026
26.7.1	25G241	September 28, 2026	25.6.0 xnu-12377.161.15.700.19~2 Tue Aug 18 17:46:40 PDT 2026
26.7.2	25G332	October 26, 2026	25.6.0 xnu-12377.161.15.701.48~2 Mon Oct 12 00:33:09 PDT 2026
26.7.3	25G342	November 9, 2026	25.6.0 xnu-12377.161.15.701.48~2 Mon Oct 12 00:33:09 PDT 2026
Legend: Unsupported Latest version Preview version

See Apple's official release notes and official security update contents.

== Notes ==
Preceded by macOS Sequoia	macOS 26 Tahoe; 2025	Succeeded by macOS Golden Gate
