= MacOS Ventura =

2022 operating system version

macOS Ventura
- Version of the macOS operating system

- Screenshot of macOS Ventura
- Developer: Apple
- OS family: Mac; Unix, based on Darwin (BSD)
- Working state: No longer supported
- Source model: Closed, with open source components
- General availability: October 24, 2022; 4 years ago
- Latest release: 13.7.8 (August 20, 2025; 15 months ago) [±]
- Update method: Software Update
- Supported platforms: x86-64, ARM64
- Kernel type: Hybrid (XNU)
- License: Proprietary software with open-source components and content licensed with APSL
- Preceded by: macOS Monterey
- Succeeded by: macOS Sonoma
- Official website: MacOS Ventura (archived at Wayback Machine)
- Tagline: Works smarter. Plays harder. Goes further.

Support status
- Unsupported as of September 15, 2025. Finder is still able to download driver updates to sync to newer devices.

macOS Ventura (System 13) is the nineteenth major release of macOS, Apple's operating system for Macintosh computers. The successor to macOS Monterey, it was announced at WWDC 2022 on June 6, 2022, and launched on October 24, 2022. macOS Ventura was succeeded by macOS Sonoma, which was released on September 26, 2023.

It is named after the city of Ventura and is the tenth macOS release to bear a name from the company's home state of California. The macOS 13 Ventura logo, official graphics and default wallpaper resemble an abstract California poppy.

macOS Ventura is the last version of macOS supporting Macs released in 2017, including the 21.5-inch 2017 iMac and the 12-inch MacBook, with the exception of the iMac Pro, which is supported by releases up to macOS Sequoia.

== New features ==
macOS Ventura includes changes, many related to productivity, and adds two apps from iOS and iPadOS: Weather and Clock. Freeform was added in an update to all three operating systems.

=== New system features ===
- Stage Manager, which provides an alternative interface for multitasking, in addition to the previous Mission Control.

=== New apps ===
- Weather: shows detailed weather forecasts. Engaging with the Weather widget now opens this app, not The Weather Channel's website.
- Clock: displays world time and manages alarms, stopwatches, and timers. Clicking on the Clock widget now opens this app, not the Date & Time section of System Preferences.
- Freeform, a whiteboard app that supports real-time collaboration (added in version 13.1).

=== Changes ===
- Mail adds "send later" and "undo send" options and includes improvements to search, email organization, and formatting.
- Spotlight produces richer search results; with Live Text, it can return pictures that contain the queried text.
- Safari adds Shared Tab Groups and Passkeys, uses WebAuthn for password-less account management, gets a redesigned sidebar, and gains AVIF support.
- Messages now allows the user to edit and unsend recent iMessages, similar to iOS 16 and iPadOS 16.
- FaceTime gets Handoff, the ability to transfer a call between multiple Apple devices.
- Continuity Camera, a feature that allows a user's iPhone to wirelessly serve as a front-facing camera, with support for Desk View on some iPhones.
- System Preferences is renamed to System Settings and gets a brand new tabbed interface and re-organized panes based on the iOS/iPadOS Settings app.
  - Because of this, the app-specific "Preferences..." menu bar item has been renamed "Settings..." for all apps.
- Photos app: iCloud Shared Photo Library allows multiple members of iCloud Family Sharing to add, edit, and delete photos in the same photo library.
- The Game Center dashboard is redesigned.
- Font Book gets a new visual design.
- Maps adds support for routes with multiple stops.
- Siri gets redesigned to match its appearance since iOS 14 and iPadOS 14.
- Apple Music adds the ability for the user to mark artists as "favorites" and receive new music notifications from those artists.
- Home supports a new architecture rebuilt from the ground up with Ventura 13.1.
- Print dialogs have been redesigned. Many users report that Print Presets no longer save all essential printer features (paper type, duplexing, color mode, print quality, etc.) requiring settings to be manually selected with every print job.
- Ability to play ambient background sounds as an accessibility feature in System Settings.
- New backgrounds and screensavers.
- A bug was fixed in Disk Utility concerning the verification of Time Machine backup volumes.
- Improved game controller support.
- Apple's Virtualization framework: better support for multitouch gestures in macOS Ventura VMs, support for graphics acceleration, folder sharing, and Rosetta 2 in Linux VMs.
- Metal 3, with support for spatial and temporal image upscaling.
- Live Text now works in videos.
- About This Mac tab was updated. It now shows an image of the device you are using and shows less information, it also gives you an option to go to System Settings to see more info about your Mac.
- Activity Monitor statistics on the graph by default now refreshes by 1 second even when the chart data is set to update every 5 seconds. This makes sure that the user can make good use of the real time CPU or RAM trackers while not wasting battery with the 1 second option. Energy Tab remains unchanged.
- Fps V-sync limits are double in relative to your monitors refresh rate in OpenGL programs. This is because of the new CAMetalLayer timing model.
- iCloud
  - Advanced Data Protection: optional end-to-end encryption for all iCloud data except emails, calendars and contacts.
  - Support for physical security keys
- Security
  - Rapid Security Response, a new update mechanism to rapidly patch security vulnerabilities without having to install a full system update; according to Apple, these patches will not require a reboot.
  - New Login Items section in System Settings (in the General pane), which shows all programs that start on boot (including all LaunchAgents and LaunchDaemons for both the user and the system). In previous versions of macOS, the Login Items list in the "Users & Groups" pane only showed programs that registered themselves to be displayed, and most malware would not have been listed.
  - Confirmation before allowing data connections with USB-C accessories, to prevent malicious USB-C chargers from installing malware.
  - Gatekeeper now checks the notarization of third-party apps every time they are launched.
  - Lockdown Mode, which prevents USB devices from connecting when the Mac is asleep, blocks the installation of MDM profiles, limits the risk of malicious attachments in the Messages app, and removes just-in-time compilation for JavaScript in Safari.
  - Built-in apps cannot be moved from the cryptographically verified Signed System Volume to another location where they could be tampered with.

=== Removed features ===
- The Preview app on Mac no longer supports PostScript (.ps) and Encapsulated PostScript (.eps) files. Printing of such files, to a printer natively supporting PostScript, remains possible by accessing the Printer Queue from System Settings and dragging the file into the queue window.
- Network Utility has been removed.
- The Network Locations feature was removed from the graphical user interface. It can still be accessed from the command line.
- Help files related to dial-up modems have been removed.
- Schedule Shutdown, Restart and Boot have been removed from the graphical user interface. They can still be accessed from the command line.
- Support for USB 1.1 accessories is removed.

== Known problems ==
- Unicode Hex Input does not work if the code point four‑digit number is 0xx0 (first and last digits in the number are zero). This issue was resolved in Ventura 13.3.
- Ventura 13.5 introduced a bug in which user-installed apps do not appear under the 'Location Services' section in the 'Privacy and Security' settings. Due to this, users are unable to modify location permissions or view the list of applications installed by them that have access to their location information. This issue was resolved in Ventura 13.5.1.

== Supported hardware ==
macOS Ventura is the last release for Macs with Apple T1 Security chip. macOS Ventura officially supports Macs with Apple silicon and Intel's Skylake-based Xeon-W and 7th-generation Kaby Lake chips or later, and drops support for Macs released from 2015 to 2016, officially marking the end of support for the Retina MacBook Pro, 2015-2017 MacBook Air, 2014 Mac Mini, 2015 iMac and cylindrical Mac Pro. The 2016 MacBook Pro is also dropped, however, the operating system can be installed and run using OpenCore because all required drivers for T1 system are present (drivers are removed in macOS Sonoma). The 21.5 inch 2017 iMac is the only supported standard configuration model to have no Retina display.

Macs that support macOS Ventura are as follows.

- iMac (2017 or later)
- iMac Pro (2017)
- MacBook (2017)
- MacBook Air (2018 or later)
- MacBook Pro (2017 or later)
- Mac Mini (2018 or later)
- Mac Pro (2019 or later)
- Mac Studio (M1, 2022 or later)

AirPlay to Mac, always-on "Hey Siri", 4K HDR streaming, and Spatial Audio are not supported on all models. Offline dictation, Live Captions, Portrait Mode in FaceTime, and "Reference mode" (which allows users to use an iPad as a secondary reference monitor) only work on Apple silicon Macs.

=== Unofficial support on older models (discontinued hardware) ===
By using patch tools, macOS Ventura can be unofficially installed on earlier models that are officially unsupported, such as a 2017 MacBook Air and a 2015 MacBook Pro. Using these methods, it is possible to install macOS Ventura on models as early as a 2008 MacBook Pro or a 2007 iMac (after a Penryn Intel CPU upgrade).

== Release history ==
The first developer beta of macOS 13 Ventura was released on June 6, 2022. Apple maintains Ventura release notes: for consumers, for enterprise, for developers, as well as a security update page.

macOS Ventura releases
Version	Build	Release date	Darwin version
13.0	22A380	October 24, 2022	22.1.0 xnu-8792.41.9~2 Sun Oct 9 20:15:52 PDT 2022
13.0	22A8380	October 24, 2022	22.1.0 xnu-8792.41.9~2 Sun Oct 9 20:15:52 PDT 2022
13.0.1	22A400	November 9, 2022	22.1.0 xnu-8792.41.9~2 Sun Oct 9 20:15:52 PDT 2022
13.1	22C65	December 13, 2022	22.2.0 xnu-8792.61.2~4 Fri Nov 11 02:06:26 PST 2022
13.2	22D49	January 23, 2023	22.3.0 xnu-8792.81.2~2 Thu Jan 5 20:53:49 PST 2023
13.2.1	22D68	February 13, 2023	22.3.0 xnu-8792.81.3~2 Mon Jan 30 20:38:43 PST 2023
13.3	22E252	March 27, 2023	22.4.0 xnu-8796.101.5~3 Mon Mar 6 20:59:28 PST 2023
13.3.1	22E261	April 7, 2023	22.4.0 xnu-8796.101.5~3 Mon Mar 6 20:59:28 PST 2023
13.3.1 (a)	22E772610a	May 1, 2023	22.4.0 xnu-8796.101.5~3 Mon Mar 6 20:59:28 PST 2023
13.4	22F66	May 18, 2023	22.5.0 xnu-8796.121.2~5 Mon Apr 24 20:52:43 PDT 2023
13.4.1	22F82	June 21, 2023	22.5.0 xnu-8796.121.3~7 Thu Jun 8 22:22:22 PDT 2023
13.4.1 (a)	22F770820b	July 10, 2023	22.5.0 xnu-8796.121.3~7 Thu Jun 8 22:22:22 PDT 2023
13.4.1 (c)	22F770820d	July 12, 2023	22.5.0 xnu-8796.121.3~7 Thu Jun 8 22:22:22 PDT 2023
13.5	22G74	July 24, 2023	22.6.0 xnu-8796.141.3~6 Wed Jul 5 22:21:56 PDT 2023
13.5.1	22G90	August 17, 2023	22.6.0 xnu-8796.141.3~6 Wed Jul 5 22:21:56 PDT 2023
13.5.2	22G91	September 7, 2023	22.6.0 xnu-8796.141.3~6 Wed Jul 5 22:21:56 PDT 2023
13.6	22G120	September 21, 2023	22.6.0 xnu-8796.141.3.700.8~1 Fri Sep 15 13:39:52 PDT 2023
13.6.1	22G313	October 25, 2023	22.6.0 xnu-8796.141.3.701.17~4 Wed Oct 4 21:25:26 PDT 2023
13.6.2	22G320	November 7, 2023	22.6.0 xnu-8796.141.3.701.17~6 Thu Nov 2 07:43:57 PDT 2023
13.6.3	22G436	December 11, 2023	22.6.0 xnu-8796.141.3.702.9~2 Tue Nov 7 21:48:06 PST 2023
13.6.4	22G513	January 22, 2024	22.6.0 xnu-8796.141.3.703.2~2 Sun Dec 17 22:18:09 PST 2023
13.6.5	22G621	March 7, 2024	22.6.0 xnu-8796.141.3.704.6~1 Mon Feb 19 19:48:53 PST 2024
13.6.6	22G630	March 25, 2024	22.6.0 xnu-8796.141.3.704.6~1 Mon Feb 19 19:48:53 PST 2024
13.6.7	22G720	May 13, 2024	22.6.0 xnu-8796.141.3.705.2~1 Mon Apr 22 20:54:28 PDT 2024
13.6.8	22G820	July 29, 2024	22.6.0 xnu-8796.141.3.706.2~1 Mon Jun 24 01:20:40 PDT 2024
13.6.9	22G830	August 7, 2024	22.6.0 xnu-8796.141.3.706.2~1 Mon Jun 24 01:20:40 PDT 2024
13.7	22H123	September 16, 2024	22.6.0 xnu-8796.141.3.707.4~1 Wed Jul 31 21:42:48 PDT 2024
13.7.1	22H221	October 28, 2024	22.6.0 xnu-8796.141.3.708.1~1 Thu Sep 5 20:48:48 PDT 2024
13.7.2	22H313	December 11, 2024	22.6.0 xnu-8796.141.3.709.7~2 Fri Nov 15 17:21:49 PST 2024
13.7.3	22H417	January 27, 2025	22.6.0 xnu-8796.141.3.709.7~4 Thu Dec 5 23:40:57 PST 2024
13.7.4	22H420	February 10, 2025	22.6.0 xnu-8796.141.3.709.7~4 Thu Dec 5 23:45:11 PST 2024
13.7.5	22H527	March 31, 2025	22.6.0 xnu-8796.141.3.711.5~1 Thu Mar 6 21:52:09 PST 2025
13.7.6	22H625	May 12, 2025	22.6.0 xnu-8796.141.3.712.2~1 Thu Apr 24 20:25:14 PDT 2025
13.7.7	22H722	July 29, 2025	22.6.0 xnu-8796.141.3.713.2~2 Tue Jul 15 08:22:28 PDT 2025
13.7.8	22H730	August 20, 2025	22.6.0 xnu-8796.141.3.713.2~2 Tue Jul 15 08:22:28 PDT 2025

== Timeline of Mac operating systems ==
Timeline of Mac operating systems

Preceded by macOS 12 (Monterey)	macOS 13 (Ventura); 2022	Succeeded by macOS 14 (Sonoma)
