= Apple Intelligence =

AI features developed by Apple Inc.

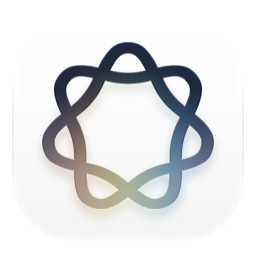

- Apple Intelligence running on MacBook Pro, iPhone, and iPad
- Developer: Apple
- Release: October 28, 2024
- Operating system: iOS 18, iPadOS 18, macOS Sequoia, visionOS 2.4
- Platform: ARM
- Type: Artificial intelligence
- License: Proprietary
- Website: apple.com/apple-intelligence

Apple Intelligence is a collection of artificial intelligence features developed by Apple. Relying on a combination of on-device and server processing, it was announced on June 10, 2024, at the 2024 Worldwide Developers Conference, as a built-in feature of Apple's iOS 18, iPadOS 18, and macOS Sequoia, which were announced alongside Apple Intelligence. Apple Intelligence is free for all users with supported devices.

On macOS, Apple Intelligence is available only on Apple silicon Mac computers; Intel-based Mac computers are not supported. Features include writing tools that assist users with grammar and proofreading, image generation, summaries of system notifications, AI-assisted image retouching in the Photos app, and integration with ChatGPT, a chatbot by OpenAI.

== History ==
=== Background ===
Apple first implemented artificial intelligence features in its products with the release of Siri in the iPhone 4S in 2011. In the years after its release, Apple engaged in efforts to ensure its artificial intelligence operations remained covert; according to University of California, Berkeley, professor Trevor Darrell, the company's secrecy deterred graduate students. The company started expanding its artificial intelligence team in 2015, opening up its operations by publishing more scientific papers and joining AI industry research groups. Apple reportedly acquired more AI companies from 2016 to 2020. In 2017, Apple released the iPhone 8 and the iPhone X with the A11 Bionic processor, which featured its first dedicated Neural Engine for accelerating common machine learning tasks. Siri's investments in artificial intelligence was criticized both by reviewers and internally at Apple for lagging behind other AI assistants.

The rapid development of generative artificial intelligence and the release of ChatGPT in late 2022 reportedly blindsided Apple executives and forced the company to refocus its efforts on AI. In an interview with Good Morning America, Apple CEO Tim Cook stated that generative AI had "great promise" but had some potential dangers, and that it was "looking closely" at ChatGPT. It was first reported in July 2023 that Apple was creating its own internal large language model, codenamed "Ajax". In October 2023, Apple was reportedly on track to release new generative AI features into its operating systems by 2024, including a significantly redeveloped Siri. In an earnings call in February 2024, Cook stated that the company was spending a "tremendous amount of time and effort" into AI features that would be shared "later that year".

=== Google deal ===
In January 2026, Apple and Google announced a multi-year partnership under which Apple's next-generation foundation models are expected to incorporate Google's Gemini models and cloud infrastructure. According to the companies, the collaboration is intended to support future Apple Intelligence features, including enhancements to Siri, while Apple Intelligence will continue to operate on Apple devices and through Apple's Private Cloud Compute system, which Apple states is designed to preserve user privacy.

On an earnings call, Apple reported to investors that they were integrating an on-device model of the Google Gemini AI to Siri, as the development of their model was beset with setbacks. Apple has previously tested and used other third-party AI models like ChatGPT, but according to a Bloomberg article by Mark Gurman, Apple pushed forward the proposed Google deal; by using Google's Gemini model possessing 1.2 trillion parameters, Apple would integrate a much larger and more complex model than those it previously developed and used. Comparable AI models from other major companies (including OpenAI and Meta) have also been reported to operate at a similar "trillion-parameter" scale and to compete against Gemini-class systems on benchmarks.

During WWDC 2026, Apple officially announced an improved version of Apple Intelligence, using a next-generation version of Apple's own models trained with the help of Gemini models. The newer version of Apple Intelligence powers an updated Siri, named "Siri AI". In a talk with the media, Apple's senior vice president (SVP) of software engineering Craig Federighi said that the new Siri does not use Gemini's models or infrastructure, but Apple's models are "trained using proprietary data with reinforcement learning and refined using outputs from Gemini frontier models".

== Models ==
Apple Intelligence consists of an on-device model as well as a cloud model running on servers primarily using Apple silicon. Both models are branded as Apple Foundation Models (AFM) and consist of a generic foundation model, as well as multiple adapter models that are more specialized to particular tasks like text summarization and tone adjustment. It was launched for developers and testers on July 29, 2024, in US English, with the developer betas of iOS 18.1, macOS 15.1, and iPadOS 18.1, and fully launched on October 28, 2024.

According to a human evaluation done by Apple's machine learning division, the on-device foundation model beat or tied equivalent small models by Mistral AI, Microsoft, and Google, while the server foundation models beat the performance of OpenAI's GPT-3, while roughly matching the performance of GPT-4.

According to Apple, Apple's cloud models are built on a Private Cloud Compute platform, which utilizes custom-designed silicon hardware tailored for end-to-end encryption. It was also designed to make sure that the software running on said servers matches the independently verifiable software accessible to researchers. In case of a software mismatch, Apple devices will refuse to connect to the servers.

Apple states that the data centers used for Private Cloud Compute have been powered by 100% renewable energy since 2018. The company has also announced a goal of achieving carbon neutrality across its products and supply chain by 2030. This addresses growing concerns about the environmental impacts of AI technologies, which have faced backlash for their high energy consumption and carbon footprint.

On June 9, 2025, Apple released the second version of AFM. They announced that AFM will be available to third-party applications as part of the Foundation Models API, with support for structured data response and tool calling.

On June 8, 2026, Apple released the third version of AFM. From the previous two models, AFM 3 is now a family of five models: two on-device models and three cloud models. The existing 3-billion-parameter on-device model is now named AFM 3 Core, while a 20-billion-parameter version, named AFM 3 Core Advanced, is available only on certain newer devices. Apple's two cloud models running on Apple servers are now called AFM 3 Cloud and ADM 3 Cloud (Image), while a more advanced model, AFM 3 Cloud Pro, runs on Nvidia GPUs on Google Cloud servers using Apple's own Private Cloud Compute guidelines.

== Features ==
=== Writing tools ===
Apple Intelligence features writing tools that are powered by LLMs. Selected text can be proofread, rewritten, made more friendly, concise, or professional, similar to the AI writing features of the online English-language writing assistant tool Grammarly. It can also be used to generate summaries, key points, tables, and lists from an article or piece of writing. In iOS 18.2 and macOS 15.2, a ChatGPT integration was added to Writing Tools through "Compose" and "Describe your change" features.

=== Real-time translation ===
Apple Intelligence enables the real-time translation of messages, photos and videos, and phone calls, through Apple's hardware. For communicating with foreigners, using the Translate app on iPhone to show subtitles in their language or to play back the translated audio naturally in their language, and also by wearing AirPods with Live Translation can now help to understand what someone is saying in users' preferred language in conversation. If both have headphones, simultaneous interpretation can be achieved.

=== Image Playground ===
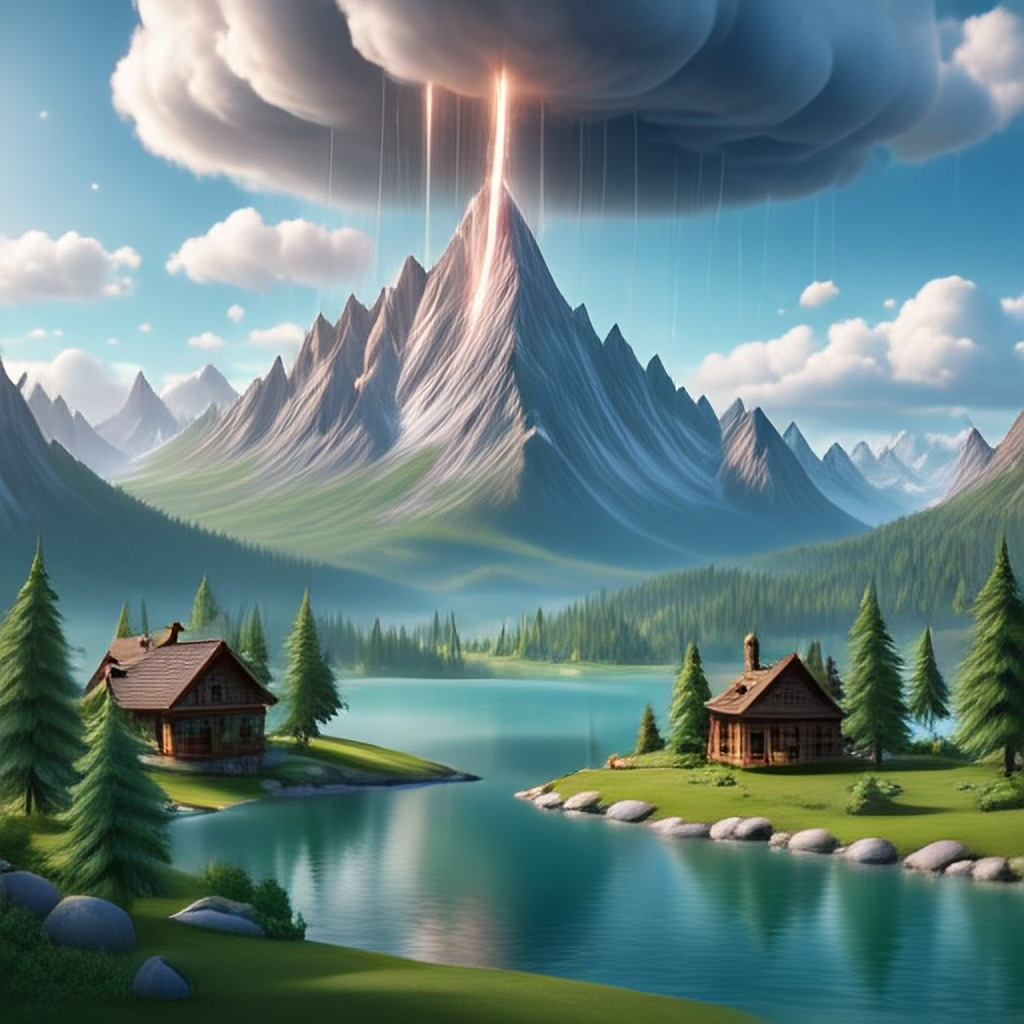
An example of a picture generated with Apple Intelligence Image Playground

Apple Intelligence can be used to generate images on-device with the Image Playground app. Similarly to OpenAI's DALL-E, it can be used to generate images using AI, using phrases and descriptions to output an image with customizable styles such as Animation and Sketch. In Notes, users can access Image Playground on iPad through the Image Wand tool in the Apple Pencil palette without having to open the Image Playground app. Rough sketches made with Apple Pencil can be transformed into images.

As part of iOS 26, iPadOS 26, and macOS 26, Image Playground now integrates with the image generation models built into ChatGPT.

=== Genmoji ===
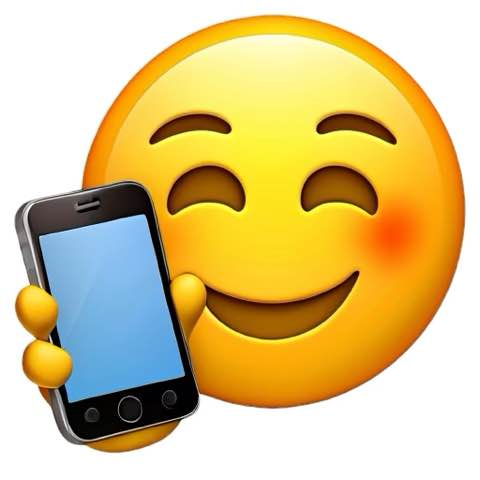
An example of a Genmoji generated by Apple Intelligence

Using Apple Intelligence text-to-image models, users can generate unique "Genmoji" images by typing descriptions (prompting). Users can pick people in photos to have Genmoji generate images that resemble them. Similarly to emoji, Genmoji can be added inline to text messages, tapbacks, and stickers, and can be shared in Messages as well in third-party applications as inline messages or as stickers.

=== Siri overhaul ===
Siri has been updated to use Apple Intelligence's large language foundation models. The first iteration of Siri with Apple Intelligence, released as part of iOS 18, features an updated user interface, improved natural language processing, and the option to interact via text by double tapping the home bar without enabling the feature in the Accessibility menu, or double-clicking the command key on macOS.

At WWDC 2024, Apple stated that Siri would be able use personal context from device activities to answer queries in a future software update. After numerous delays, this feature was released in beta as part of Apple's late 2026 OS releases, as part of a wider overhaul of Siri named "Siri AI".

=== Mail ===
Apple Intelligence adds a feature called Priority Messages to the Mail app, which shows urgent emails such as same-day invitations or boarding passes, with AI generated summaries of the email. The Mail app also gains the ability to categorize incoming mail into Primary, Transactions, Updates, and Promotions based on what the email contains, which Apple says is done all on-device.

=== Photos ===
Apple's Photos app includes a feature to create custom memory movies and enhanced search capabilities. Users can describe a story, and using Apple Intelligence, Photos selects matching photos, videos, and music. Users can also remove distractions in images with the Clean Up tool in the Photos app. Apple Intelligence identifies background objects and removes them with a tap, brush, or circle. It organizes these into a movie with a narrative arc based on identified themes. Additionally, users can search for specific photos or videos by description or keyword, and Apple Intelligence can pinpoint particular moments within video clips.

=== Notifications ===
Using the Notification Summary feature, Apple Intelligence can summarize notifications from messaging apps and groups of notifications from apps so that users do not have to examine large numbers of notifications. A new Reduce Interruptions focus mode silences notifications deemed unimportant while letting important notifications go through.

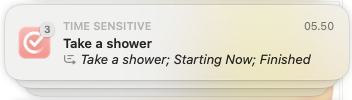
An example of a notification summarized by Apple Intelligence

=== Visual intelligence ===
On the iPhone 16, 16 Plus, 16 Pro, and 16 Pro Max, or later, users are able to hold down the Camera Control button and take a picture of an item to then either send to ChatGPT or search with Google. The image taken is not stored on-device, and Apple says they do not have access to the image either. This is meant to allow people to learn more about items faster. This feature was also made available on the iPhone 15 Pro, iPhone 15 Pro Max, iPhone 16e, and later devices, starting with iOS 18.4, via the action button or in the Control Center. It was also introduced to compatible iPads, Macs, and Apple Vision Pros in late 2026.

=== ChatGPT integration ===
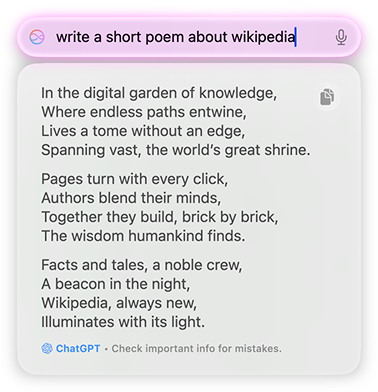
ChatGPT integrated into Siri, Apple's virtual assistant

As a result of the company's partnership with OpenAI, Apple Intelligence includes a system-wide integration with ChatGPT, allowing Siri to determine when to send certain complex user requests to ChatGPT. This system-wide integration is powered by GPT-4o. ChatGPT integration is opt-in by default, with users being prompted before any data or photos are sent to ChatGPT servers and IP addresses being obscured when requests are sent to OpenAI's servers. Using ChatGPT features is free for all users without needing to sign in; however, they will only get a limited number of GPT-4o requests until switching to a less powerful GPT. Paid subscribers can sign in to gain access to paid features systemwide including more requests using GPT-4o. Apple plans to integrate other models such as Google's Gemini into the system in the future.

== Supported devices ==
All iPhones, iPads, and Macs that have an Apple M-series or the A17 Pro, or newer chip, are supported with iOS 18.1, iPadOS 18.1, and macOS 15.1 respectively. Apple says the less capable Neural Engine of older chips, which is used for AI tasks, are not powerful enough for Apple Intelligence features. Analyst Ming-Chi Kuo states that the RAM requirements of the on-device model prohibits Apple Intelligence from running on older iPhone models. On March 31, 2025, Apple Intelligence was introduced to the Apple Vision Pro with the release of visionOS 2.4.

Apple Intelligence cannot be used on Macs if the operating system is booted off of an external drive, but workarounds exist to circumvent the limitation.

More advanced Apple Intelligence features in iOS 27, iPadOS 27, visionOS 27 and macOS 27 enabled by a larger on-device model, such as more expressive voices for Siri and advanced dictation, are only available on iPhones with the Apple A19 Pro chip or later, iPads with the M4 chip or later and at least 12 GB of memory, and Macs with the M3 chip or later and at least 12 GB of memory. Other new features in those releases, including Siri AI, are available for all devices that support Apple Intelligence. The model and expressive voices are available on Apple Vision Pro (M5).

Apple Intelligence logo in macOS

=== Mac models ===
- MacBook Neo (A18 Pro)
- MacBook Air (M1, 2020) or later
- MacBook Pro (M1, 2020) or later
- Mac Mini (M1, 2020) or later
- Mac Pro (M2 Ultra, 2023)
- Mac Studio (M1 Max or M1 Ultra, 2022) or later
- iMac (M1, 2021) or later

=== iPad models ===
- iPad Pro (M1, 5th generation, 2021) or later
- iPad Air (M1, 5th generation, 2022) or later
- iPad Mini (A17 Pro, 7th generation, 2024) or later

=== iPhone models ===
- iPhone 15 Pro, 15 Pro Max, or later
- iPhone 16, 16 Plus, or later
- iPhone 16e or later
- iPhone Air
- iPhone Duo

=== Other devices ===
- Apple Vision Pro (M2) or later
- Apple TV 4K (4th generation)
- HomeView

== Release ==
=== Release timeline ===
iOS / iPadOS version	macOS version	Date	Apple Intelligence features
18.1	15.1	October 28, 2024	Writing Tools (proofread, summarize, and rewrite only); Siri (new look, type to Siri, better with context only); Smart Replies; Notification Summary; Photos Clean Up and Memory Maker; Reduce Interruptions Focus Mode
18.2	15.2	December 11, 2024	More Writing Tools (compose, describe changes with ChatGPT); Image Playground; Image Wand; Siri (ChatGPT integration only); Mail Categorization (iPhone); Genmoji (iPhone and iPad only for now); Visual Intelligence (iPhone 16, 16 Pro, or later)
18.4	15.4	March 31, 2025	Priority Notifications; Mail Categorization (iPad and Mac); Image Playground Sketch; Visual Intelligence (iPhone 15 Pro, 15 Pro Max, and iPhone 16e)
26.0		September 15, 2025	Live Translation in Messages, FaceTime, and Calls; Enhanced Genmoji (Combining existing emojis and ChatGPT Integration); Enhanced Visual Intelligence (Screenshot Support, Integration with Other Apps, Ask with ChatGPT); Enhanced Image Playground (More styles with ChatGPT Integration); Apple Intelligence Actions in Shortcuts; Workout Buddy for Apple Watch; Foundation Models Framework for Developers
26.4		March 24, 2026	Playlist Playground (for iPhone)
27.0		September 14, 2026	New Siri (built with Google Gemini technology); Personal Context; Dedicated Siri App; Custom Voice Models; Siri Mode in Camera; Spatial Reframing and Extend Tool in Photos; System-wide "Write with Siri"; Conversational Visual Assistance (overhauled VoiceOver with advanced context tracking via the Action button, alongside high-contrast zoom and natural language app controls in Magnifier); Smarter Accessibility Reader (integrates deep text formatting cleanup, automated table extraction from images, on-demand summaries, and instant translation); Flexible Voice Control Inputs (permits native navigation using highly informal or user-defined descriptive phrasing, like "tap the gear icon" or "click the corner button"); Stronger LLM available in newer devices with sufficient RAM.; On Apple Watch Ultra 4: Live Rewind; Siri Recap; Audio Intelligence

=== Language support ===
iOS/iPadOS version	macOS version	Release date	Supported languages
18.1	15.1	October 28, 2024	English (US)
18.2	15.2	December 11, 2024	English (Australia); English (Canada); English (Ireland); English (New Zealand); English (South Africa); English (UK)
18.4	15.4	March 31, 2025	Chinese (Simplified); English (India); English (Singapore); Portuguese (Brazil); French; German; Italian; Japanese; Korean; Portuguese; Spanish; Vietnamese
26.1		November 3, 2025	Chinese (Traditional); Danish; Dutch; Norwegian; Portuguese (Portugal); Swedish; Turkish

=== International releases ===
The United Kingdom, Ireland, Australia, Canada, New Zealand, and South African English–localized variants gained support on December 11, 2024. On March 31, 2025, localized versions for Chinese (simplified), English (India), English (Singapore), French, German, Italian, Japanese, Korean, Portuguese, Spanish, and Vietnamese were added as part of iOS 18.4, macOS 15.4, and iPadOS 18.4. It also rolled out in the European Union, and brought support to the Apple Vision Pro. As of July 2026, Apple Intelligence support for the Vision Pro is currently only available in US English. As of March 2026, it is not available yet on devices purchased in mainland China or on any device using an Apple Account set to mainland China, even if the device was bought elsewhere.

==== China rollout ====
As the ChatGPT service is not accessible in mainland China, Apple had to consider integrating local Chinese large language models in devices targeting their mainland Chinese market (this arrangement does not apply to Hong Kong and Macau).

In early 2025, reputable news outlets reported that Apple had entered into a partnership with Alibaba Group to integrate Alibaba's Qwen large language models into Apple Intelligence for devices sold in mainland China. Earlier reporting indicated Apple had explored working with Baidu to adapt Chinese-language AI models for iPhones, but encountered technical and performance hurdles during integration efforts.

The rollout has been subject to regulatory review by the Cyberspace Administration of China and has faced delays attributed to regulatory and geopolitical issues. Major outlets reported that Apple was targeting a China-specific launch of Apple Intelligence features in mid-to-late 2025, while noting those features may be adapted to meet local regulatory requirements. US officials were reported to have raised concerns about the arrangement between Apple and local Chinese partners on national security and data access grounds.

On July 15, 2026, the Cyberspace Administration of China approved Apple Intelligence for use on iPhones in China.

On October 31, 2026, Apple announced that the first wave of Apple Intelligence features will be released to users in mainland China in December with the iOS 27.3 update, following a developer beta rollout starting November 4. The initial rollout introduces system-wide features such as Writing Tools, Live Translation, Clean Up in Photos, Visual Intelligence, and notification summaries, alongside an integration with Alibaba Group's Qwen model for external knowledge and generative tasks.

== Reception ==
=== Critical response ===
Apple Intelligence received mixed reviews upon its release. Allison Johnson of The Verge described the release as "underwhelming", but cited the feature of notification summarization as "a little more promising".

In March 2025, technology commentator John Gruber criticized Apple's promotion of personalized Siri features before they were ready for release. He distinguished features that Apple had shown to journalists from the personalized Siri capabilities shown only in a concept video, arguing that the latter had been marketed without a working demonstration.

=== News summary controversy ===
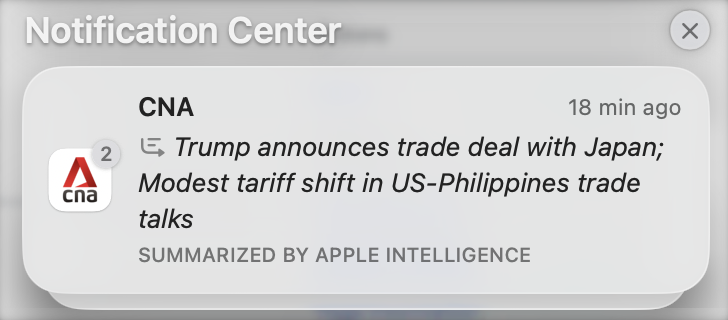
News summary with Apple Intelligence label

In December 2024, the BBC sent a complaint to Apple over its notification summary feature hallucinating the BBC News app to have reported that Luigi Mangione, then recently arrested following the shooting of UnitedHealthcare CEO Brian Thompson, had killed himself. In January 2025, the BBC followed up its complaint highlighting further incorrect summaries of its stories, such as announcing that Luke Littler had won the PDC World Darts Championship hours before the final had even taken place (though he did win), and that "Brazilian tennis player" Rafael Nadal (who is actually Spanish) had come out as gay, a story that was in reality about Brazilian player João Lucas Reis da Silva.

In a response to the BBC, an Apple spokesperson said that all Apple Intelligence features were still in beta and were being continuously improved, and encouraged users to send feedback for unexpected summaries. Notification summaries for all news applications were later disabled in the iOS 18.3 beta, and a disclaimer was added to the Settings app warning that summaries "may contain errors". This was eventually enabled back on iOS 26 beta 4; however, all news summaries now have a "Summarized by Apple Intelligence" label.

=== Lawsuit over false advertising ===
Landsheft v. Apple Inc.
- Court: United States District Court for the Northern District of California
- Full case name: Peter Landsheft, individually and on behalf of all others similarly situated v. Apple Inc.
- Docket nos.: 5:25-cv-02668
- Defendant: Apple Inc.
- Counsel for plaintiff: Clarkson Law Firm, P.C.; Kaplan Fox & Kilsheimer LLP; Cotchett, Pitre & McCarthy, LLP
- Plaintiff: Peter Landsheft

Court membership
- Judge sitting: Noël Wise

Keywords
- class action

On March 19, 2025, a federal lawsuit was filed in the US District Court for the Northern District of California over allegations of false advertising and unfair competition regarding the delayed launch of some of its Apple Intelligence features: Landsheft v. Apple Inc., No. 5:25-cv-02668 (N.D. Cal.). The complaint said:

Last summer, Apple launched a pervasive marketing campaign across all media platforms to promote its latest iPhone 16 model, spotlighting what it branded as the groundbreaking "Apple Intelligence" suite of features, including significant AI-driven enhancements to Siri. For months, the trillion-dollar tech giant touted these AI capabilities as the cornerstone of the new iPhone's appeal, promising consumers a product that would redefine smartphone use in the new AI economy. Apple's advertisements saturated the internet, television, and other airwaves to cultivate a clear and reasonable consumer expectation that these transformative features would be available upon the iPhone's release. This drove unprecedented excitement in the market, even for Apple, as the company knew it would, and as part of Apple's ongoing effort to convince consumers to upgrade at a premium price and to distinguish itself from competitors deemed to be winning the AI-arms race. But Apple also knew none of it was true. Recently, under mounting pressure from outraged consumers and industry scrutiny, Apple was forced to acknowledge that the heralded Apple Intelligence features, including the Siri enhancements that fueled the greatest consumer excitement, did not exist then and do not exist now. Worse, Apple has admitted that if these features ever materialize, it won't be until 2026—two years after its pervasive marketing campaign built on a lie. Against this backdrop, Apple deceived millions of consumers into purchasing new phones they did not need based on features that do not exist, in violation of multiple false advertising and consumer protection laws.

In September 2025, Apple filed a motion to dismiss the case, arguing that only two out of the "nearly two dozen" promised features were left out of the release.

On December 18, 2025, the parties filed a joint notice of settlement, stating that they "have reached an agreement in principle to resolve this matter on a classwide basis" and "are currently in the process of memorializing that agreement in a formal settlement agreement", requesting that all deadlines be vacated and that they be required to file a status report by March 18, 2026. The court approved the requested motion, and additionally denied Apple's motion to dismiss without prejudice and ordered a "compliance hearing regarding the status of settlement" on March 25, 2026.

In May 2026, Apple agreed to a proposed $250 million settlement, subject to court approval. The proposed class covered approximately 37 million eligible iPhones purchased in the United States between June 10, 2024, and March 29, 2025. Apple did not admit wrongdoing and said the agreement concerned the availability of two additional features.

== See also ==
- Multimodal large language model – Type of machine learning model
