= MacOS Monterey =

2021 operating system version

macOS Monterey
- Version of the macOS operating system

- Screenshot of macOS Monterey in light appearance
- Developer: Apple
- OS family: Macintosh; Unix, based on Darwin (BSD)
- Working state: No longer supported
- Source model: Closed, with open source components
- General availability: October 25, 2021; 5 years ago
- Latest release: 12.7.6 (21H1320) (July 29, 2024; 2 years ago) [±]
- Update method: Software Update
- Supported platforms: x86-64, ARM64
- Kernel type: Hybrid (XNU)
- License: Proprietary software with open-source components and content licensed with APSL
- Preceded by: macOS Big Sur
- Succeeded by: macOS Ventura
- Official website: MacOS Monterey (archived at Wayback Machine)
- Tagline: High powered meets "Hi everyone."

Support status
- Unsupported as of September 16, 2024. Finder is still able to download driver updates to sync to newer devices.

macOS Monterey (version 12) is the eighteenth major release of macOS, Apple's desktop operating system for Macintosh computers. The successor to macOS Big Sur, it was announced at WWDC 2021 on June 7, 2021, and released on October 25, 2021. macOS Monterey was succeeded by macOS Ventura, which was released on October 24, 2022.

The operating system is named after Monterey Bay, continuing the trend of releases named after California locations since 2013's 10.9 Mavericks.

macOS Monterey is the final version of macOS that supports the 2015–2017 MacBook Air, Retina MacBook Pro, 2014 Mac Mini, 2015 iMac and cylindrical Mac Pro, as its successor, macOS Ventura, drops support for those models. It is the last version of macOS that can run on Macs with 4 GB of RAM and MagSafe 2 Macs, and is the first version to run on a MacBook with MagSafe 3.

== Changes ==
Monterey introduced several new features and changes, including the following:

- Shortcuts for the Mac
- TestFlight for the Mac
- Provisions to allow the planned introduction of Universal Control, which allows a single keyboard and mouse to control multiple Macs and iPads. It works on Macs with Apple silicon and some with an Intel processor, including MacBook Pro (2016 and later), MacBook (2016 and later), MacBook Air (2018 and later), iMac (2017 and later), iMac (5K Retina, 27-inch, Late 2015), iMac Pro, Mac Mini (2018 and later), and Mac Pro (2019). It works on these iPads: iPad Pro, iPad Air (3rd generation and later), iPad (6th generation and later), and iPad Mini (5th generation and later).
- Support for the Apple Music Voice Plan Subscription.
- Portrait Mode and Noise Cancellation features for FaceTime and some apps (in Control Center).
- New Toolbar features and designs for Finder and the Preview app.
- Have a Live Memoji and Animoji right on the lock screen.
- A yellow privacy indicator on the menu bar for indicating if the Mac's microphone or camera is active.
- Live Text, which allows a user to copy, paste, translate and look up text from images displayed by Photos, Screenshot, Quick Look, and Safari.
- New Passwords Manager for Mac
- New on-device machine-learning–activated keyboard dictation using Siri, and also now for almost unlimited duration.
- Low Power Mode for Mac that enables longer battery life for lightweight workflows such as reading PDFs, Web browsing, listening to music, etc. This works on MacBook Air (2018 and later) and MacBook Pro (2016 and later).
- A redesigned optional compact interface for the Safari browser.
- Support for playing AirPlay content streamed from recent iOS and iPadOS devices and Macs, including MacBook Pro (2018 and later), MacBook Air (2018 and later), iMac (2019 and later), iMac Pro (2017), Mac Mini (M1, 2020 and later), Mac Pro (2019), iPhone 6s and later, iPad Pro (2nd generation and later), iPad Air (3rd generation and later), iPad (6th generation and later), and iPad Mini (5th generation and later). Older iPhone, iPad, and Mac models may share content at a lower resolution to supported Mac models when "Allow AirPlay for" is set to "Everyone" or "Anyone on the same network" in Sharing preferences.
- Improvements to FaceTime, including the ability to share a screen and the SharePlay function that enables multiple users to watch or listen simultaneously and in sync (e.g., to music or TV shows).
- The ability to factory reset the Mac from the System Preferences app.
- Visual Look Up makes it easy to identify objects (e.g. cat breeds, dog breeds, etc.) found within user's photos.
- Focus to set different modes to filter notifications across iPhones, iPads and Macs.
- The Time Machine backup functionality excludes more system files.
- Provisions to allow the planned introduction of "Expanded Protections for Children," which will apply cryptography to detect and help limit the spread of child pornography, officially known as "child sexual abuse material" (CSAM) online by scanning the user's iCloud photos., until the feature was cancelled due to backlash and user discomfort.
- Accessibility option to change the mouse pointer's colors.
- Tips notifications.
- The removal of a previously bundled PHP interpreter.
- The removal of a previously bundled Python 2.7 interpreter (from 12.3)
- The removal of the ability to use custom Quartz Composer filters and plugins in Photo Booth.
- networkQuality, a command-line tool for measuring upload/download capacity, upload/download flows, and upload/download responsiveness
- An automatically populated "Games" folder within launchpad
- Support for ProMotion in new 2021 MacBook Pro
- New Object Capture API for creating 3D models using images

=== Applications ===
==== Notes ====
In the Notes application, users can now apply arbitrary tags to a note (e.g., #cooking, #work); groups of notes with a given tag or tags can be viewed in Smart Folders or a Tag Browser in the sidebar. The new Quick Notes function enables a user to create a note from within any app via system-wide keyboard shortcut or hot corner.

==== Maps ====
Apple Maps adds a 3D globe, with increased mountain, desert, and forest detail.

==== Messages ====
Messages supports new features, also introduced in iOS 15, such as "Shared with You" which provides shortcut links to content shared via Messages in other Apple apps such as Safari, Photos, Music, and News.

When multiple photos are sent/received, they are now displayed as a collection instead of multiple messages. A download button is provided to download all photos simultaneously.

== Known problems ==
Users and developers have reported the following:

- Laptops unable to boot (fixed with 12.0.1 update)
- Inability to charge sleeping laptops with MagSafe (fixed with 12.1 update)
- Mouse pointer memory leak issue (fixed with 12.1 update)
- Audio issue with speaker and audio output crackling and popping
- Problems connecting external displays to Mac using any version of Monterey
- Unicode Hex Input does not work if the code point number is 0??0 (first and last digits are zero) (fixed in Ventura 13.3)
- DualShock 3 controllers no longer work

== Supported hardware ==
macOS Monterey drops support for Macs released from 2013 to 2014, including all Macs with Nvidia GPUs.

Macs that support macOS Monterey are as follows.

- iMac (Late 2015 or later)
- iMac Pro (2017)
- MacBook (Early 2016 or later)
- MacBook Air (Early 2015 or later)
- MacBook Pro (Early 2015 or later)
- Mac Mini (Late 2014 or later)
- Mac Pro (Late 2013 or later)
- Mac Studio (2022)

By using patch tools, macOS Monterey can be unofficially installed on earlier computers that are officially unsupported, such as the 2014 iMac and the 2013 MacBook Pro. Using these methods, it is possible to install macOS Monterey on computers as old as a 2008 MacBook Pro and iMac and 2009 Mac Mini.

== Release history ==
macOS Monterey releases
| Version | Build | Release date | Darwin Version | Release notes |
|---|---|---|---|---|
| 12.0 | 21A344 | October 25, 2021 | 21.0.1 xnu-8019.30.61~4 Tue Sep 14 20:56:24 PDT 2021 | Release notes Security content |
| 12.0.1 | 21A559 | October 25, 2021 | 21.1.0 xnu-8019.41.5~1 Wed Oct 13 17:33:23 PDT 2021 | Release notes Security content |
| 12.1 | 21C52 | December 13, 2021 | 21.2.0 xnu-8019.61.5~1 Sun Nov 28 20:28:54 PST 2021 | Release notes Security content |
| 12.2 | 21D49 | January 26, 2022 | 21.3.0 xnu-8019.80.24~20 Wed Jan 5 21:37:58 PST 2022 | Release notes Security content |
| 12.2.1 | 21D62 | February 10, 2022 | 21.3.0 xnu-8019.80.24~20 Wed Jan 5 21:37:58 PST 2022 | Release notes Security content |
| 12.3 | 21E230 | March 14, 2022 | 21.4.0 xnu-8020.101.4~2 Mon Feb 21 20:34:37 PST 2022 | Release notes Security content |
| 12.3.1 | 21E258 | March 31, 2022 | 21.4.0 xnu-8020.101.4~15 Fri Mar 18 00:45:05 PDT 2022 | Release notes Security content |
| 12.4 | 21F79 (Note: Public release) | May 16, 2022 | 21.5.0 xnu-8020.121.3~4 Tue Apr 26 21:08:22 PDT 2022 | Release notes Security content |
| 12.4 | 21F2081 (Note: Preinstalled on 2022 M2 MacBook Air & 13-inch Pro) | June 14, 2022 | 21.5.0 xnu-8020.121.3~4 Tue Apr 26 21:08:22 PDT 2022 | Release notes Security content |
| 12.4 | 21F2092 (Note: Update for 2022 M2 MacBook Air & 13-inch Pro) | June 16, 2022 | 21.5.0 xnu-8020.121.3~4 Tue Apr 26 21:08:22 PDT 2022 | Release notes Security content |
| 12.5 | 21G72 | July 20, 2022 | 21.6.0 xnu-8020.140.41~1 Sat Jun 18 17:07:22 PDT 2022 | Release notes Security content |
| 12.5.1 | 21G83 | August 17, 2022 | 21.6.0 xnu-8020.141.5~2 Wed Aug 10 14:25:27 PDT 2022 | Release notes Security content |
| 12.6 | 21G115 | September 12, 2022 | 21.6.0 xnu-8020.140.49~2 Mon Aug 22 20:17:10 PDT 2022 | Release notes Security content |
| 12.6.1 | 21G217 | October 24, 2022 | 21.6.0 xnu-8020.240.7~1 Thu Sep 29 20:12:57 PDT 2022 | Release notes Security content |
| 12.6.2 | 21G320 | December 13, 2022 | 21.6.0 xnu-8020.240.14~1 Sun Nov 6 23:31:16 PST 2022 | Release notes Security content |
| 12.6.3 | 21G419 | January 23, 2023 | 21.6.0 xnu-8020.240.18~2 Mon Dec 19 20:44:01 PST 2022 | Release notes Security content |
| 12.6.4 | 21G526 | March 27, 2023 | 21.6.0 xnu-8020.240.18.700.8~1 Thu Mar 9 20:08:59 PST 2023 | Release notes Security content |
| 12.6.5 | 21G531 | April 10, 2023 | 21.6.0 xnu-8020.240.18.700.8~1 Thu Mar 9 20:08:59 PST 2023 | Release notes Security content |
| 12.6.6 | 21G646 | May 18, 2023 | 21.6.0 xnu-8020.240.18.701.5~1 Mon Apr 24 21:10:53 PDT 2023 | Release notes Security content |
| 12.6.7 | 21G651 | June 21, 2023 | 21.6.0 xnu-8020.240.18.701.6~1 Thu Jun 8 23:57:12 PDT 2023 | Release notes Security content |
| 12.6.8 | 21G725 | July 24, 2023 | 21.6.0 xnu-8020.240.18.702.13~1 Thu Jul 6 22:18:26 PDT 2023 | Release notes Security content |
| 12.6.9 | 21G726 | September 11, 2023 | 21.6.0 xnu-8020.240.18.702.13~1 Thu Jul 6 22:18:26 PDT 2023 | Release notes Security content |
| 12.7 | 21G816 | September 21, 2023 | 21.6.0 xnu-8020.240.18.703.5~1 Fri Sep 15 16:17:23 PDT 2023 | Release notes Security content |
| 12.7.1 | 21G920 | October 25, 2023 | 21.6.0 xnu-8020.240.18.704.15~1 Wed Oct 4 23:55:28 PDT 2023 | Release notes Security content |
| 12.7.2 | 21G1974 | December 11, 2023 | 21.6.0 xnu-8020.240.18.705.10~1 Thu Nov 9 00:38:19 PST 2023 | Release notes Security content |
| 12.7.3 | 21H1015 | January 22, 2024 | 21.6.0 xnu-8020.240.18.706.2~1 Sun Dec 17 22:55:27 PST 2023 | Release notes Security content |
| 12.7.4 | 21H1123 | March 7, 2024 | 21.6.0 xnu-8020.240.18.707.4~1 Mon Feb 19 20:24:34 PST 2024 | Release notes Security content |
| 12.7.5 | 21H1222 | May 13, 2024 | 21.6.0 xnu-8020.240.18.708.4~1 Wed Apr 24 06:02:02 PDT 2024 | Release notes Security content |
| 12.7.6 | 21H1320 | July 29, 2024 | 21.6.0 xnu-8020.240.18.709.2~1 Mon Jun 24 00:56:10 PDT 2024 | Release notes Security content |

See Apple's main pages for Monterey release notes: for consumers and for enterprise, as well as their current security content page.

== Timeline of Mac operating systems ==
Timeline of Mac operating systems

| Preceded by macOS 11 (Big Sur) | macOS 12 (Monterey); 2021 | Succeeded by macOS 13 (Ventura) |
