= MacOS Sequoia =

2024 operating system version

macOS Sequoia
- Version of the macOS operating system

- Screenshot of macOS Sequoia
- Developer: Apple
- OS family: Mac; Unix, based on Darwin (BSD)
- Source model: Closed, with open-source components
- General availability: September 16, 2024; 2 years ago
- Latest release: 15.8.3 (November 9, 2026; 6 days ago) [±]
- Update method: Apple Software Update
- Supported platforms: x86-64 (Intel-based); ARM64 (Apple silicon)
- Kernel type: Hybrid (XNU)
- License: Proprietary software with open-source components and content licensed with APSL
- Preceded by: macOS Sonoma
- Succeeded by: macOS Tahoe
- Official website: MacOS Sequoia (archived at Wayback Machine)
- Tagline: Sharp as a Mac.

Support status
- Receiving Safari and OS security updates.

macOS Sequoia (version 15) is the twenty-first major release of Apple's macOS operating system. The successor to macOS Sonoma, it was announced at WWDC 2024 on June 10, 2024. In line with Apple's practice of naming macOS releases after landmarks in California, it is named after Sequoia National Park, located in the Sierra Nevada mountain range.

The first developer beta was released on June 10, 2024. The first public beta was released on July 15, 2024. It was released on September 16, 2024. Sequoia is the first version of macOS released on the same day as a new iOS and iPadOS version.

It was succeeded by macOS Tahoe on September 15, 2025.

Sequoia is the final version of macOS to officially support the iMac Pro, the 2019 iMac, most Intel-based MacBook Pros (excluding the 2019 16-inch model and the 2020 13-inch model with four Thunderbolt 3 ports), 2018 Mac Mini, and the 2020 Intel MacBook Air, as its successor, macOS Tahoe, drops supports for those models. It is also the final version to officially support Macs that do not feature the T2 security chip.

== Development ==
macOS Sequoia was announced by senior vice president of software engineering Craig Federighi at Apple's Worldwide Developers Conference (WWDC) on June 10, 2024. It was announced alongside iOS 18, iPadOS 18 and watchOS 11. Eight developer betas and six public betas were released.

== Features ==
macOS Sequoia introduced several new features and improvements, mainly focused on productivity:

- iPhone Mirroring, a feature to mirror and interact with content from an iPhone running iOS 18 as a macOS window, has been introduced. It is supported on all Macs that run Sequoia except the 2019 iMac, which lacks a T2 chip. This function is not available in the European Union due to the lack of conformity to the Digital Markets Act (DMA).
- The Calculator app has been redesigned to be more similar to that of iOS and iPadOS, including rounded buttons, departing from the design that has been used since OS X Yosemite.
- Notes has been updated with the Math Notes feature, which can be used to calculate simple equations, evaluate expressions, and assign variables within the app.
- Passwords, a cross-platform password manager application, was introduced, which replaces Keychain.
- In System Settings, individual menus have been rearranged and slightly redesigned to quickly access frequently used menus.
- Safari has been revamped, including revamped reader mode (now called Reader), faster page load times, a new start page, a new option to hide a singular element on a webpage, and a new unified menu; these had previously been exclusive to compact mode on iOS and iPadOS.
- macOS Sequoia includes the second iteration of Game Porting Toolkit, a Windows API compatibility layer derived from Wine and CrossOver, allowing developers to more easily port Windows games to macOS.
- Apple Intelligence is available on all Apple silicon Macs (except those purchased in mainland China) and includes artificial intelligence features such as a redesigned Siri, Writing Tools which selects text can be proofread or have its tone changed, Smart Reply in Mail to quickly draft email responses, and a system-wide integration with ChatGPT.
- Window tiling is now automatically suggested by macOS when dragging a window to the edges of the display, similar to the Aero Snap feature included in Microsoft Windows.
- The Tips app is now an independent app from the rest of the operating system. The user interface (UI) has also been redesigned, and has replaced the previous Help system included in earlier versions of macOS. The app surfaces individual user guides for apps such as Freeform, Pages, Keynote, Notes, and Apple TV, and also surfaces user guides for any other devices a user may own, such as an iPhone, Apple Watch or Apple TV. As an independent app, it can also be pinned to the Dock.

=== New Unicode characters font support ===
==== macOS 15.0 ====
- Bengali Abbreviation Sign (U+09FD) (10.0)
- CJK Unified Ideographs Extension G (U+30EDD-U+30EDE) (13.0)

==== macOS 15.1 ====
- Mongolian Free Variation Selector (U+180F) (14.0)

==== macOS 15.4 ====
- Arabic End of Text Mark (U+061D) (14.0)
- Gujarati Marks (U+0AFA-U+0AFF) (10.0)
- Oriya Sign Overline (U+0B55) (13.0)
- Telugu Letter Nakaara Pollu (U+0C5D) (14.0)
- Telugu Sign Siddham (U+0C77) (12.0)
- Kannada Sign Siddham (U+0C84) (11.0)
- Kannada Letter Nakaara Pollu (U+0C5D) (14.0)
- Malayalam Sign Combining Anusvara Above (U+0D00) (10.0)
- Malayalam Letter Vedic Anusvara (U+0D04) (13.0)
- Malayalam Chillu Letters (U+0D54-U+0D56) (9.0)
- Malayalam Fractions (U+0D58-U+0D5E) (9.0)
- Malayalam Fractions (U+0D76-U+0D78) (9.0)
- Sinhala Sign Candrabindu (U+0D81) (13.0)

=== Revived Unicode Characters Font Support ===
==== macOS 15.1 ====
- Mongolian Letter Cha with Two Dots (U+1878) (11.0)
- Mongolian Supplement (U+11660-U+1166C) (9.0)

== Supported hardware ==
macOS Sequoia supports Macs with Apple silicon and those with Intel's Skylake-based Xeon W and eighth-generation Coffee Lake chips or later. A Mac with an M1 chip or later is required to use Apple Intelligence. macOS Sequoia supports every Mac that supports macOS Sonoma, with the exception of the 2018 and 2019 MacBook Air models with Intel Amber Lake chips. Similar to Sonoma, the 2019 iMac is the only supported Intel Mac that lacks a T2 security chip. macOS Sequoia is the first version of macOS to drop support for a Mac with a T2 security chip. Unofficial installation of macOS Sequoia on non-supported Macs is possible using a compatible patch utility, such as OpenCore Legacy Patcher.

The following devices are compatible with macOS Sequoia:

- iMac (2019 or later)
- iMac Pro (2017)
- MacBook Air (2020-2025)
- MacBook Pro (2018-2024)
- Mac Mini (2018-2024)
- Mac Pro (2019 or later)
- Mac Studio (2022-2025)

== Release history ==
The first developer beta of macOS Sequoia was released on June 10, 2024. As with macOS Sonoma, the Sequoia developer betas are available to anyone with an Apple Developer account, without needing a developer subscription.

macOS Sequoia releases
Version	Build	Release date	Darwin version
15.0	24A335	September 16, 2024	24.0.0 xnu-11215.1.10~2 Mon Aug 12 20:52:31 PDT 2024
15.0.1	24A348	October 3, 2024	24.0.0 xnu-11215.1.12~1 Tue Sep 24 23:39:07 PDT 2024
15.1	24B83	October 28, 2024	24.1.0 xnu-11215.41.3~2 Thu Oct 10 21:00:32 PDT 2024
15.1	24B2083	October 28, 2024	24.1.0 xnu-11215.41.3~3 Thu Oct 10 21:06:57 PDT 2024
15.1.1	24B91	November 19, 2024	24.1.0 xnu-11215.41.3~13 Thu Nov 14 18:15:21 PST 2024
15.1.1	24B2091	November 19, 2024	24.1.0 xnu-11215.41.3~13 Thu Nov 14 18:15:21 PST 2024
15.2	24C101	December 11, 2024	24.2.0 xnu-11215.61.5~2 Fri Dec 6 19:01:59 PST 2024
15.3	24D60	January 27, 2025	24.3.0 xnu-11215.81.4~3 Thu Jan 2 20:24:06 PST 2025
15.3.1	24D70	February 10, 2025	24.3.0 xnu-11215.81.4~3 Thu Jan 2 20:24:06 PST 2025
15.3.2	24D81	March 11, 2025	24.3.0 xnu-11215.81.4~3 Thu Jan 2 20:24:06 PST 2025
15.3.2	24D2082	March 11, 2025	24.3.0 xnu-11215.81.4~4 Thu Jan 2 20:31:12 PST 2025
15.4	24E248	March 31, 2025	24.4.0 xnu-11417.101.15~1 Wed Mar 19 21:16:31 PDT 2025
15.4.1	24E263	April 16, 2025	24.4.0 xnu-11417.101.15~1 Wed Mar 19 21:16:31 PDT 2025
15.5	24F74	May 12, 2025	24.5.0 xnu-11417.121.6~2 Tue Apr 22 19:53:27 PDT 2025
15.6	24G84	July 29, 2025	24.6.0 xnu-11417.140.69~1 Mon Jul 14 11:28:17 PDT 2025
15.6.1	24G90	August 20, 2025	24.6.0 xnu-11417.140.69~1 Mon Jul 14 11:30:34 PDT 2025
15.7	24G222	September 15, 2025	24.6.0 xnu-11417.140.69.701.11~1 Mon Aug 11 21:16:52 PDT 2025
15.7.1	24G231	September 29, 2025	24.6.0 xnu-11417.140.69.701.11~1 Mon Aug 11 21:16:52 PDT 2025
15.7.2	24G325	November 3, 2025	24.6.0 xnu-11417.140.69.703.14~1 Wed Oct 15 21:12:21 PDT 2025
15.7.3	24G419	December 12, 2025	24.6.0 xnu-11417.140.69.705.2~1 Wed Nov 5 21:30:23 PST 2025
15.7.4	24G517	February 11, 2026	24.6.0 xnu-11417.140.69.709.8~1 Fri Feb 27 19:33:24 PST 2026
15.7.5	24G624	March 24, 2026	24.6.0 xnu-11417.140.69.708.3~1 Mon Jan 19 22:00:10 PST 2026
15.7.7	24G720	May 11, 2026	24.6.0 xnu-11417.140.69.710.16~1 Tue Apr 21 20:17:54 PDT 2026
15.7.8	24G824	July 27, 2026	24.6.0 xnu-11417.140.69.711.44~1 Tue Jul 21 20:50:07 PDT 2026
15.7.9	24G830	August 6, 2026	24.6.0 xnu-11417.140.69.711.44~1 Tue Jul 21 20:50:07 PDT 2026
15.8	24H23	September 14, 2026	24.6.0 xnu-11417.140.69.712.69~1 Sun Aug 23 20:30:56 PDT 2026
15.8.1	24H32	September 28, 2026	24.6.0 xnu-11417.140.69.712.69~1 Sun Aug 23 20:30:56 PDT 2026
15.8.2	24H232	October 26, 2026	24.6.0 xnu-11417.140.69.713.47~2 Sun Oct 11 23:36:58 PDT 2026
15.8.3	24H241	November 9, 2026	24.6.0 xnu-11417.140.69.713.47~2 Sun Oct 11 23:36:58 PDT 2026
Legend: Supported Latest version Preview version

See Apple's official release notes, and official security update contents.

== Timeline of Mac operating systems ==
Timeline of Mac operating systems

== See also ==
- Apple Intelligence
- iOS 18
- iPadOS 18
- tvOS 18
- visionOS 2
- watchOS 11

Preceded by macOS 14 Sonoma	macOS 15 Sequoia; 2024	Succeeded by macOS 26 Tahoe
