= Mac transition to PowerPC processors =

Change of processors in Apple computers

The Mac transition to PowerPC processors was the process of switching the central processing units (CPUs) of Apple's line of Macintosh computers from the Motorola 68000 series to PowerPC processors co-developed with IBM and Motorola. The transition began in March 1994 with the launch of the Power Macintosh series and was largely completed by mid-1996, though Apple continued supporting 68k systems in its software until 1998.

== Background ==
Since their launch in 1984, Macintosh computers had used Motorola 68000-series CPUs. By the early 1990s, these processors were falling behind Intel’s offerings, driving Apple to seek more efficient, higher-performing hardware.

=== RISC exploration (1988–1990) ===
The first Power Macintosh models were released in March 1994, but the development of Power Macintosh technology dates back to mid-1988.

Jean-Louis Gassée, president of Apple's product division, started the "Jaguar" project to create a computer that would be the fastest desktop computer on the market, capable of voice commands. This was originally envisioned to be a new computer line altogether, not a Macintosh, and the Jaguar team was initially kept independent of the Macintosh team. This separation included operating system development, with the newly conceived "Pink" operating system considered for the new computer. Jaguar was also not intended to be a high-volume, mainstream system. Gassée's preference, as it was with the upcoming Macintosh IIfx, was to create a product that would compete in the high-end workstation market, previously not an area of strength for Apple. The decision to use RISC architecture was representative of a shift in the computer industry in 1987 and 1988, where RISC-based systems from Sun Microsystems, Hewlett-Packard, and IBM were significantly outpacing the performance offered by systems based on Motorola's 68020 and 68030 processors and Intel's 80386 and 80486 CPUs. Initially, Apple invested considerable time and effort in an attempt to create their own RISC CPU in a project code-named "Aquarius", even to the point where a Cray-1 supercomputer was purchased to assist with designing the chip. The company lacked the financial and manufacturing resources to produce a working product and the project was cancelled in 1989. Intel's Andy Grove tried to persuade Apple to migrate to x86, but Apple concluded that Intel's CISC architecture would not be competitive with RISC.

By early 1990, Apple was in contact with a number of RISC vendors to find a suitable hardware partner. The team that had created the IIfx independently started experimenting with creating a new Macintosh product that would combine a Motorola 68030 processor with an AMD Am29000 (29k) RISC chip. Apple had already released a product built on the 29k, the Macintosh Display Card 8•24 GC, a so-called "Macintosh Toolbox accelerator" NuBus card that provides significantly faster drawing routines than those included on the Macintosh ROM. The team's experiments resulted in a 68020 emulator implemented in RISC, but the 29k project was dropped in mid-1990 due to financial infeasibility.

Apple evaluated CPU architectures including MIPS, SPARC, i860, and ARM—of which the last would, much later, be used across many Apple product families. Negotiations with Sun included the condition that Sun would use the Macintosh interface for its SPARC workstation computers in exchange for Apple using Sun's SPARC processors in Macintosh workstations; the deal was canceled due to Apple's concern that Sun could not produce enough processors. Negotiations with MIPS to use the R4000 processor also included the condition that the Macintosh interface would be available as an alternative to the Advanced Computing Environment. This deal was canceled due to Microsoft being a major partner in the ACE Consortium, as well as concerns about manufacturing capability. The Intel i860 was eliminated from consideration due to its high complexity. Apple did not consider IBM's POWER1 processor as an option, believing that IBM would not be willing to license it to third parties.

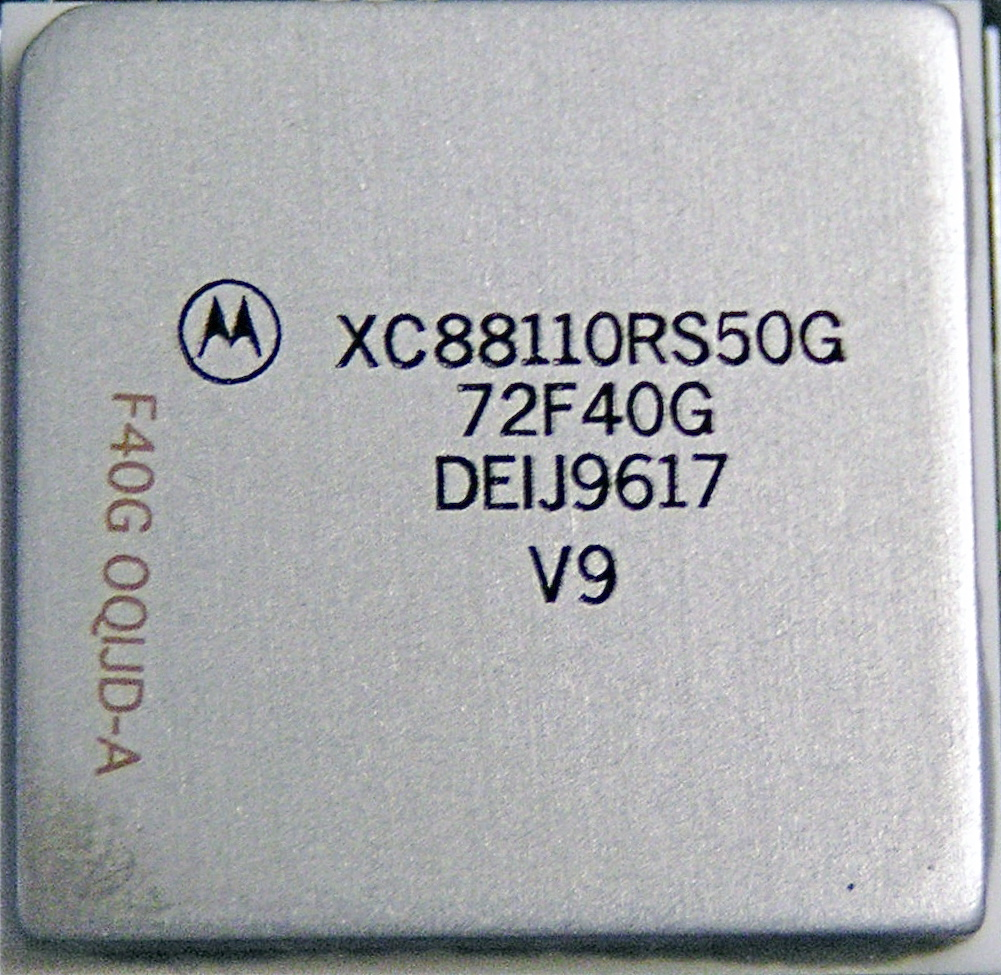
Motorola 88110 RISC CPU

In mid-1990, Apple chose the Motorola 88110, an as-yet unfinished chip that combined the 88100 CPU and 88200 FPU into a single package. For the rest of the year, Apple's engineers developed a 68k emulator that would work with this future chip. This project became known as "RLC", short form "RISC LC", a play on the name of Apple's upcoming Macintosh LC computer. By January 1991, the engineering team had produced a prototype of a Macintosh LC with its 68020 CPU being swapped out for an 88100 and a 68020 emulator. This prototype was able to use an unmodified Macintosh Toolbox ROM and could boot into System 7. A few months later, a second prototype was created, utilizing a Macintosh IIsi case with the now-completed Motorola 88100 chip.

Jaguar wasn't initially intended to be a high-volume mainstream system. Instead, mass-market RISC systems would follow sometime later. After Gassée left Apple in early 1990, the goal of the Jaguar project was refocused to be a mainstream Macintosh system instead of a new platform. The Jaguar project was folded into the Macintosh team in early 1991. While the Jaguar project itself never came to fruition, and Taligent never resulted in a functional operating system, many of the elements originally developed by the Jaguar hardware and software teams were brought to market in mid-1993 with the Centris 660AV and Quadra 840AV, including the Apple Adjustable Keyboard, Apple AudioVision 14 Display, GeoPort, and PlainTalk. The new case designs introduced with the Centris 610 and Quadra 800 had also originated in the Jaguar team.

=== Development and partnership with IBM (1991–1993) ===
By mid-1991, there was internal concern at Apple that the 88100 may not be the correct processor to move forward with as no other computer manufacturers had committed to using the processor. Using IBM's POWER was again considered, but it was a seven-chip design at the time, which was not desirable from a cost perspective. Engineers from Apple and IBM's Advanced Workstations and Systems Division met in Austin, Texas to discuss creating a single-chip version of IBM's POWER1 RISC architecture. Motorola was also present at Apple's request. IBM had already been working on such a chip, called the RISC Single Chip (RSC), to reduce the production cost of their entry-level RS/6000 workstation systems. In these meetings, a number of changes were proposed to RSC that would facilitate lower costs, lower power usage, and higher yield production suitable for both the Macintosh and future RS/6000 products.

In early July, executives at the three companies reached an agreement which was formally announced to the public in October. In addition to the new RISC architecture, which was given the name PowerPC, this "AIM alliance" had several goals, including creating an operating system based on Pink, an object-oriented scripting language called ScriptX, and a cross-platform media player called the Kaleida Media Player. Of the alliance, John Sculley said, "The Macintosh strategy paid off very well for us in the 1980s, but we didn't think we could establish the next generation of computing by using that model in the 1990s. Working with IBM, and making it available to everyone, we can have a much wider impact with these technologies than we did with the Macintosh."

Development of the PowerPC 601 chip started in October 1991 and was completed in 21 months, with volume production starting in July 1993. The first computers to ship with a PowerPC chip were a line of IBM RS/6000 workstations in September 1993. Many Macintosh application developers used these machines for the development of the initial PowerPC ports of their products, as Macintosh-based PowerPC development tools were not ready. The PowerPC 603 (which focused on lowering power usage) and 604 (which focused on high performance) projects were also underway at the same time.

In July 1992, the decision was made to scale back the ambition of the initial system software release; instead of attempting to create a completely new kernel, Apple focused on producing a version of System 7 where portions of the existing Macintosh Toolbox ROM were rewritten to use native PowerPC code instead of emulating a 680x0. This provided a significant performance boost for certain highly utilized parts of the operating system, particularly QuickDraw.

== Transition ==
The first public demonstration of the new Power Macintosh — specifically, a prototype of what would become the Power Macintosh 6100 – was at an Apple Pacific sales meeting in Hawaii in October 1992. The demo was a success, and in the following months, the product plan expanded to include three models: the entry-level 6100, a mid-range 7100 housed in the Macintosh IIvx's desktop case, and a high-end 8100 based on the Quadra 800's mini-tower case. A fourth project, the Macintosh Processor Upgrade Card, was started in July 1993 to provide a straightforward upgrade path to owners of Centris- and Quadra-based Macintosh computers. The importance of this was especially significant for the Quadra 700, 900, and 950, which were not going to receive full logic board replacements. Computers upgraded in this fashion received new names such as "Power Macintosh Q650" and "Power Macintosh 900".

The original plan was to release the first Power Macintosh machine on January 24, 1994, exactly ten years after the release of the first Macintosh. Ian Diery, who was EVP and general manager of the Personal Computer Division at the time, moved the release date back to March 14 in order to give manufacturing enough time to build enough machines to fill the sales channels and to ensure that the Macintosh Processor Upgrade Card would be available at the same time. This was a departure from prior practice at Apple; they had typically released upgrade packages months after the introduction of new Macintoshes.

Apple unveiled the first Power Macintosh models on March 14, 1994. These used the 32-bit PowerPC 601 CPU, manufactured by IBM/Motorola. The first portable Mac models to use PowerPC processors were the PowerBook 5300 series, released on August 25, 1995, and featuring the PowerPC 603e chip.

All PowerPC Macs shipped with a built-in emulator that ran unmodified 68k code, including much of the system software, at about 60–70% of native 68040 performance.

Developers distributed fat binaries containing both 68k and PowerPC code, allowing a single application package to run on both architectures. Development tools and documentation from Apple enabled rapid developer adoption. By late 1995, most major Mac software had PowerPC-native versions.

== Aftermath ==
Apple continued selling some 68k-based Macs into 1996 but ended production of new 68k models by mid‑1996 with the discontinuation of the PowerBook 190. The Mac system software continued supporting 68k through Mac OS 8.1, released in 1998; Mac OS 8.5 dropped 68k support entirely and required a PowerPC processor.

The PowerPC transition restored Apple’s performance competitiveness, especially in multimedia and graphics-intensive markets. The successful use of emulation and fat binaries influenced two later Apple transitions: to Intel x86 in 2006 and to Apple silicon (ARM) in 2020.

However, Apple's classic Mac OS left little room for modern OS features, prompting a later shift to the NeXTSTEP-derived macOS platform. Eventually, PowerPC lost competitiveness in power efficiency, leading to the Intel transition in 2006. The final PowerPC-based Mac model released was the Power Mac G5 in November 2005, and Mac OS X Snow Leopard removes support for PowerPC-based Macs.

Sculley said in 2003 that choosing PowerPC over Intel for Apple was "probably one of the biggest mistakes I've ever made".

== See also ==
- List of Mac models grouped by CPU type
