= Nukernel =

Microkernel

NuKernel
- Developer: Jeff Robbin, Thomas E. Saulpaugh, Bill M. Bruffey, Russell T. Williams
- Working state: Discontinued
- Source model: Closed-source
- Initial release: 1993; 33 years ago
- Final release: Patent filing / 1996
- Marketing target: Personal computers
- Available in: English
- Supported platforms: PowerPC
- Kernel type: Microkernel
- Default user interface: GUI
- License: Proprietary
- Preceded by: Mach
- Succeeded by: XNU

NuKernel is a microkernel that was developed at Apple Computer during the early 1990s. It was the basis for the Copland operating system. It was written from scratch and designed using concepts from the Mach 3.0 microkernel, with extensive additions for soft real-time scheduling to improve multimedia performance. Only one NuKernel version was released, with a Copland alpha release.

Apple's NuKernel is not the microkernel in BeOS, nukernel.

== History ==
NuKernel traces its history to the lengthy delays in the Taligent project, a joint Apple-IBM to develop a new modern kernel that could run various operating systems on top, which they referred to as "personalities". As delays in the project grew, Bill Bruffey, one of the authors of the Hierarchical File System used in the classic Mac OS, gave up on Taligent and started writing his own microkernel designed specifically to run Mac OS on top, rather than multiple personalities.

In the aftermath of the failure of Copland, Apple began looking for other options. They initially considered using BeOS as the basis for a future Mac operating system. The idea was to replace Be's kernel with NuKernel, and using Be's application programming interfaces on top. This would allow Apple to leverage their previous work on hosting the existing Mac OS on NuKernel, instead of having to port that to Be's kernel. This would also allow them to run older Mac software, a Java virtual machine, and new PowerPC native apps built on Be.

After Apple purchased NeXT instead of Be, at the urging of Ellen Hancock, there was still some momentum to use NuKernel as the basis for the new OS. This suggestion apparently offended Steve Jobs, and Hancock was soon demoted to research and development, into a position that was eliminated shortly after. The official death of NuKernel was on 3 February 1997 when the decision was made to move forward with the Mach kernel from NeXT.

The one-time technical lead for NuKernel, Jeff Robbin, was one of the leaders of iTunes and the iPod.

== Description ==
The External Reference Specification (ERS) for NuKernel is contained in its entirety in its patent.

== See also ==
- XNU, the microkernel in Mac OS X
- Mac OS nanokernel, the microkernel in the line of Power Macintosh computers
