= Sherlock (software) =

Defunct web search tool created by Apple

- Sherlock 3.6, Movies channel
- Developer: Apple Inc.
- Final release: 3.6.2 (179)
- Operating system: Classic Mac OS 8 and 9, Mac OS X (prior to Leopard)
- Successor: Spotlight
- Type: File manager Search engine
- Website: www.apple.com/lae/sherlock/

Sherlock is a now-defunct file and web search tool created by Apple for the "classic" Mac OS, and carried through to early versions of Mac OS X. Sherlock was introduced in 1998 with Mac OS 8.5 as an extension of Finder's file searching capabilities. Like its predecessor—System 7.5’s revamped 'Find File' app, adapted by Bill Monk from his 'Find Pro' find program—Sherlock searches for local files and file contents on a Mac, using the same basic indexing code and search logic found in AppleSearch. Sherlock extended the system by enabling the user to search for items on the World Wide Web through a series of plug-ins, which employed existing web search engines. These plug-ins were written as plain text files, so that it was a simple task for a user to write a Sherlock plug-in.

Sherlock was replaced by Spotlight and Dashboard in 2005 with Mac OS X 10.4 Tiger, although Apple continued to include it with the default installation. Since most of the standard plug-ins for Sherlock provided by Apple itself no longer function, it was officially retired and removed in the release of Mac OS X 10.5 Leopard in 2007.

== Data ==
The Sherlock 2 search plug-in was an SGML document, and was typically given the ".src" file extension. The Sherlock plug-in was composed of three parts, identified by their element names: <search>, <input>, and <interpret> tags. These elements allowed Sherlock to (respectively) identify a search engine's web page and the parts that are relevant to searching, as well as returning the results of the search. There was also a facility for defining how a Sherlock plug-in could update itself.

Sherlock search plug-ins could also be used (with minor modifications) in Mozilla's browser suites. These plug-ins were, appropriately enough, known as Mycroft project plug-ins (named after Mycroft Holmes, Sherlock Holmes' older brother). Among some of the changes made in the Sherlock file format were the separation of the automatic update element (which formed part of the <search> element) and the icon (provided in a separate file in Mozilla and part of the resource fork in Sherlock).

== Sherlock 3 channels ==
The Sherlock 3 search plug-in was a web application, which was downloaded on the fly from a server to ensure the most current version. As information on the internet is subject to change so quickly, this was one way for Apple to guarantee the up-to-date version. A channel consisted of a web directory with an index. This usually pointed to a sub-directory (usually called "Channel") which contained the code XML, any Script XML, and localized lproj directories (nib file and Localized Text Resources as a plist).

The channels included by default were:

- Internet
- Pictures
- Stocks
- Movies
- eBay
- Flights
- Dictionary
- Translation
- AppleCare

== Current status ==
As Sherlock was never released as a Universal binary, it is not compatible with Mac OS X versions after Mac OS X 10.6 Snow Leopard and couldn't be launched on Intel Macs without Rosetta.

== Accusations of plagiarism ==
Advocates of Watson made by Karelia Software, LLC claim that Apple copied their product without permission, compensation, or attribution in producing Sherlock 3. Some disagree with this claim, stating that Sherlock 3 was the natural evolution of Sherlock 2, and that Karelia Software was open that Watson was inspired by Sherlock.

== Sherlocked as a term ==
The phenomenon of Apple releasing a feature that supplants or obviates third-party software is so well known that being Sherlocked has become an accepted term used within the Mac and iOS developer community.

== Versions ==
- Sherlock – introduced in Mac OS 8.5.
- Sherlock 2 – shipped with Mac OS 9, new interface, more plug-ins.
- Sherlock 3 – shipped with Mac OS X 10.2, runs only in Mac OS X.
- Sherlock was replaced by Spotlight in Mac OS X 10.4 Tiger for hard drive searches, and replaced by Dashboard for other functionality, but remained as a stand-alone program with its channels. It was completely removed in Mac OS X 10.5 Leopard.

== See also ==
- OpenSearch (specification)
