= Mac OS X Server 1.0 =

Server operating system developed by Apple

- Mac OS X Server 1.0, showing the Workspace Manager
- Developer: Apple Computer
- OS family: Unix-like
- Working state: No longer supported
- Source model: Closed-source
- Latest release: 1.2v3 / October 27, 2000; 26 years ago
- Supported platforms: PowerPC
- Kernel type: Hybrid (XNU) (mostly monolithic)
- Default user interface: Workspace Manager
- Preceded by: Rhapsody
- Succeeded by: Mac OS X Server 10.0; Mac OS X Public Beta
- Official website: Mac OS X Server 1.0 at the Wayback Machine (archived December 19, 2022)

Mac OS X Server 1.0 is an operating system developed by Apple Computer. Released on March 16, 1999, it was Apple's first commercially released operating system derived from NeXTSTEP following its acquisition of NeXT in 1997, and preceded the release of the consumer version of Mac OS X by two years. It was marketed as an integrated server operating system and included Apple File Services, Macintosh Manager, the Apache HTTP Server, WebObjects, NetBoot, and QuickTime Streaming Server.

Mac OS X Server 1.0 was based on Rhapsody, Apple's NeXTSTEP-based operating system that was intended to replace the classic Mac OS. It combined elements of Apple's Platinum appearance with the NeXTSTEP interface. It supported applications written for the OpenStep APIs ("Yellow Box") and existing Mac OS applications running within an emulated Mac OS 8 environment ("Blue Box").

Mac OS X Server 1.0 was succeeded by Mac OS X Server 10.0 in May 2001.

== Development ==
After Apple's 1996 acquisition of NeXT, the company announced an effort to eventually replace the classic Mac OS with a product based on NeXTSTEP. Rhapsody was presented for the first time at the Worldwide Developers Conference (WWDC) in May 1997, which was a variant of NeXTSTEP with a Mac OS-styled interface skin and ports of technologies such as AppleScript and QuickTime. Rhapsody supported the OpenStep APIs, branded as the "Yellow Box", and allowed Mac OS to run in an emulated environment known as the "Blue Box" (→ Mac-on-Linux). However, Rhapsody proved to be unpopular among third-party developers (including, in particular, Adobe Systems), who took issue with Apple's plans for the Yellow Box to be the only API for native applications on Rhapsody, and requiring legacy software to either be rewritten for Rhapsody or run in the Blue Box environment.

Amid the criticism, Apple shelved the plan for Rhapsody to be the next version of Mac OS; in October 1997, interim CEO Steve Jobs stated that it would adopt a strategy of consumer- and enterprise-specific operating systems similar to Microsoft Windows and Windows NT, with Rhapsody repurposed as a server operating system targeting enterprise markets, and being followed by a new consumer-oriented version of Mac OS. At WWDC 1998, Mac OS X was announced for a release in late-1999 following Rhapsody, with plans for a new API ("Carbon") intended to allow existing Mac OS software to be easily ported to OS X with minimal changes.

=== Release ===
During Macworld Expo in January 1999, Apple officially unveiled the Rhapsody-based Mac OS X Server 1.0. Steve Jobs demonstrated the OS using the newly-unveiled blue and white Power Mac G3, including running an iMac as a diskless workstation using NetBoot, and demonstrating the QuickTime Streaming Server by streaming videos over a network to 50 iMacs. Mac OS X Server 1.0 was initially to be priced at US$995 (equivalent to $1,920 in 2025), and also made available on a server-oriented configuration of the Power Mac G3. However, ahead of the March 16, 1999 release, the price was lowered to US$499 (equivalent to $960 in 2025).

The OS was updated several times, with the final release of version 1.2 v3 coming on October 27, 2000.

== Features ==
Mac OS X Server 1.0 is largely based on Rhapsody, which itself is based on NeXTSTEP and its Mach kernel. It bundles multiple server applications, including a file server, the Apache HTTP Server and WebObjects, NetBoot, and QuickTime Streaming Server.

Its user interface is a modification of the Display PostScript-based architecture and Workspace Manager shell used by NeXTSTEP, although reskinned to resemble the Mac OS 8 "Platinum" design. As with Rhapsody, it only supports applications written for the OpenStep-based "Yellow Box" APIs, or running within the "Blue Box" emulation environment (the "Mac OS" app).

== Reception ==
Although marketed as a large advancement over AppleShare IP, it cost $499 and did not support Apple's own FireWire, making it incompatible with products like MicroNet's SANcube, a line of external high-speed high-capacity storage systems (debuting in the year 2000 for $4599 to $6999). Buyers of Mac OS X Server 1.0 (who often purchased new Macs to run it) and the SANcube were forced to downgrade to AppleShare IP in order to use it. Mac OS X Server 1.0 was quickly orphaned, in favor of Mac OS X 10.0, with no discount for those who purchased it and wished to purchase Mac OS X Server 10.0. The result is that some considered the release premature and even a bait and switch.

== Release history ==
Version	Code name	Released	OS name	Darwin version
1.0	Hera1O9	March 16, 1999	Rhapsody 5.3	0.1
1.0.1	Hera1O9	April 15, 1999	Rhapsody 5.4	0.2
1.0.2	Hera1O9+Loki2G1	July 29, 1999	Rhapsody 5.5	0.3
1.2	Pele1Q10	January 14, 2000	Rhapsody 5.6	0.3
1.2 v3	Medusa1E3	October 27, 2000	Rhapsody 5.6	0.3

== Timeline ==
Timeline of Mac operating systems

== See also ==
- Rhapsody (operating system)
- Mac OS X Server
