= Mac transition to Intel processors =

2005–2006 change of processors in Apple computers

The Mac transition to Intel processors was the process of switching the central processing units (CPUs) of Apple's line of Mac and Xserve computers from PowerPC processors over to Intel's x86-64 processors. (Note: Initial models featured a 32-bit x86 CPU, and were subsequently replaced with an x86-64 CPU.) The change was announced at the 2005 Worldwide Developers Conference (WWDC) by Apple CEO Steve Jobs, who said Apple would gradually stop using PowerPC microprocessors supplied by Freescale (formerly Motorola) and IBM.

The transition was the second time Apple had switched the processor instruction set architecture of its personal computers, after the Mac transition to PowerPC processors in 1994 from the original Motorola 68000 series architecture.

Apple's initial press release originally outlined that the move would begin by June 2006, with completion slated by early 2008 – the transition had proceeded faster than anticipated. The first-generation Intel-based Macs were released in January 2006 with Mac OS X 10.4.4 Tiger. In August, Jobs announced the last models to switch, with the Mac Pro available immediately and the Intel Xserve available by October, although shipments for the latter computer line did not start until December.

The final version of Mac OS X that ran on PowerPC processors was Leopard, released in October 2007, with PowerPC binary translation support (using Rosetta) persisting up through the following version, Snow Leopard. Support was later dropped in Lion.

In 2020, Apple announced that it would shift its Mac line to Apple silicon, which are ARM-based systems-on-a-chip developed in-house.

== Background ==
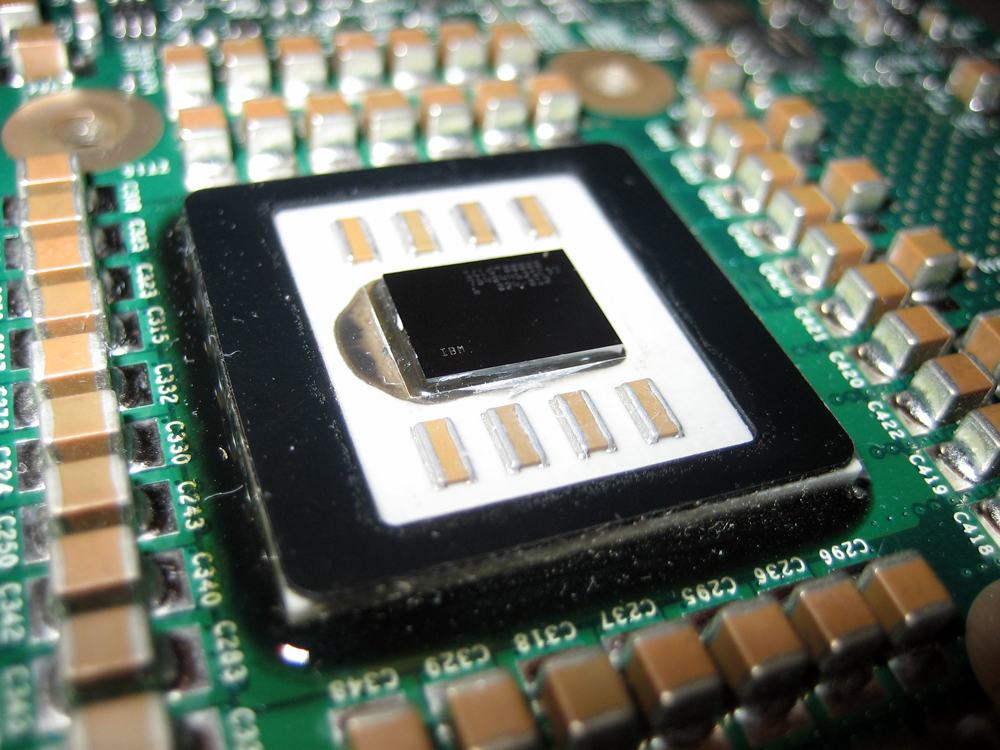
A PowerPC 970FX processor, which was used in a number of Apple computers featuring PowerPC G5 processors

Apple had been using PowerPC processors in its products for 11 years when the move to Intel processors was announced.

At 2003's WWDC keynote address, Jobs unveiled a Power Mac with a processor from IBM's PowerPC G5 product line, the first personal computer to feature a 64-bit processor.

He promised a 3 GHz Power Mac G5 within 12 months, but never released such a product. In 2004's WWDC keynote address, Jobs addressed the broken promise, saying IBM had trouble moving to a fabrication process lower than the 90 nm process. Apple officials also said in 2003 they planned to release a PowerBook with a G5 processor, but such a product never materialized. Tim Cook, then Apple's Executive Vice President of Worldwide Sales and Operations, said during an earnings call that putting a G5 in a PowerBook was "the mother of all thermal challenges".

In addition, there were reports that IBM officials had concerns over the profitability of a low-volume business, which caused tensions with Apple and its desires for a wide variety of PowerPC processors.

== History ==
=== 1980s ===
Apple's efforts to move to Intel hardware began in 1985. After Jobs left the company an internal proposal was quickly disapproved by management, which also declined a late-1980s proposal by Andy Grove of Intel for Apple to migrate to x86.

=== 1990s ===
In the 1990s, Intel often took out ads in Macworld convincing Macintosh users to switch to PCs powered by Intel CPUs.

The first known attempt by Apple to move to Intel's platform was the Star Trek project, a code name given to a secret project to run a port of Classic Mac OS System 7 and its applications on an Intel-compatible personal computer. The effort began on February 14, 1992, with the blessing of Grove.

Apple leaders set an October 31 deadline to create a working prototype. The team met that deadline, and had a functional demo ready by December. John Sculley's departure during the Star Trek project was a factor in the project's termination. Michael Spindler, the new CEO, instead devoted most of Apple's resources to the Mac transition to PowerPC processors, resulting in Power Macintosh.

After Apple's 1997 acquisition of NeXT, Apple began to rework the NeXTSTEP operating system into a successor to the classic Mac OS, codenamed Rhapsody. Jobs (who rejoined Apple upon the purchase) demonstrated an Intel-compatible build of Rhapsody to Dell founder and namesake Michael Dell. Jobs offered to license the new OS to Dell for its PCs, so that users could choose between it and Windows. However, Dell declined when Jobs insisted that the company license the operating system for every PC it ships, regardless of whether or not the user wanted to use Mac OS.

=== Early 2000s ===
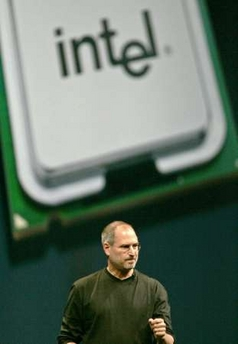
Then-CEO Steve Jobs announces the Intel transition at WWDC 2005.

In the years after the end of the Star Trek project, there were reports of Apple working to port its operating system to Intel's x86 processors, with one engineer managing to get Apple's OS to run on a number of Intel-powered computers.

In 2001, Jobs and then Sony president Kunitake Andō reportedly had a meeting to discuss the possibility of running Apple's operating system on its Vaio computers. Jobs even presented a Vaio running Mac OS. Such negotiations ultimately came to nothing.

In 2002, it was reported that Apple had more than a dozen software engineers tasked to a project code-named "Marklar," with a mission to steadily work on maintaining X86-compatible builds of Mac OS X.

It was noted in 2003 by IBM in an article published to its intranet that Apple felt a transition to Intel would present massive software changes that it wanted to avoid. Nevertheless, rumors of an impending announcement of a transition to Intel cropped up in 2000 and 2003.

Sculley said in 2003 that not choosing Intel for Apple was "probably one of the biggest mistakes I've ever made". Apple did not foresee Intel's ability to improve x86's CISC architecture to match RISC, and did not have access to commodity x86 components to compete on price with rivals like Dell, he said.

=== 2005 ===
News reports of an impending announcement by Apple to transition to Intel processors surfaced in early June 2005, close to that year's WWDC. The announcement was made during that year's WWDC Keynote Address.

At the time Apple announced the transition, Jobs attributed the switch to a superior product roadmap that Intel offered, as well as an inability to build products envisioned by Apple based on the PowerPC product roadmap. Meanwhile, pricing disputes with IBM, in addition to a desire by Apple to give its computer the ability to run Microsoft Windows, were reportedly factors for the switch as well.

== Reaction to the change ==
At the time, a research director for Ovum Ltd. called the move "risky" and "foolish", noting that Intel's innovation in processor design is overshadowed by both AMD and IBM. Another analyst said the move risks diluting Apple's value proposition, since it will now have less control over its product road map, in addition to the risk of alienating its loyal users.

=== AMD ===
Some observers expressed surprise that Apple made a deal with Intel instead of with AMD. By 2005, AMD had become popular with gamers and the budget conscious, but some analysts believed AMD's lack of low-power designs at the time was behind Apple's decision to go with Intel.

In 2011, Apple investigated using AMD's low power Llano APU for the MacBook Air, but eventually opted for Intel due to AMD's potential inability to supply enough Llano processors to meet demand.

=== 32-bit regression ===
Apple had created the world's first consumer 64-bit desktop computer with its G5 based line-up; however, the first Intel-based Macs included only Intel Core Duo processors, which were 32-bit. Apple refreshed its line of computers six months later, adding Intel's new Intel Core 2 Duo 64-bit processors.

=== Concerns over Rosetta performance ===
When Rosetta was announced, it was noted that the translation software is designed to translate applications that run on a "PowerPC with a G3 processor and that are built for Mac OS X." It was noted at the time that translated software performs at a level between 50% and 80% of native software. The announcement caused concerns over performance.

=== Intel ===
At the time the transition was announced, it was noted that a degree of enmity towards Intel exists amongst some fans of Apple products, due to Intel's close identification with Microsoft. Intel's then-CEO, Paul Otellini, noted that Apple and Intel's relationship was strained at times, especially due to Apple's commission of an ad that shows Intel processors being outperformed by PowerPC processors.

While there were questions over whether Apple would put the Intel Inside stickers on its products, Jobs dispelled such a possibility, saying it is redundant when Apple's use of Intel processors is well-known. "Intel Inside" stickers have never been included on any Apple product.

=== Osborne effect ===
There was concern that an early announcement of the change would cause an Osborne effect, but it would merely mean only a delay of purchases of Mac computers by retail and institutional customers, not permanent cancellations, and that Apple had enough cash on hand to weather a possible decline in computer sales.

Analysis of financial data suggests that the Osborne Effect did not materialize, with sales for Macs growing by 19% and 37% in the two quarters following March 2006.

=== Product compatibility ===
The Classic environment, the Mac OS 9 virtualization measure for Mac OS X, was not ported to the x86 architecture, leaving the new Intel-powered Macs incompatible with classic Mac OS applications without a proper third-party PowerPC emulator.

There were also concerns over third-party software support, with reaction to the change being mixed amongst the software developer community, due to a need to recompile software for compatibility on Intel-based Macs. In early 2006, it was reported that a number of software companies, such as Adobe, Aspyr and Microsoft, were not ready to release universal binary versions of their software offerings.

=== Technical issues ===
In the years prior to Apple's announcement of the transition, it was noted that there was a debate over the difference of endianness between Intel and non-Intel processors, as well as the merits of each CPU architecture. The difference in endianness meant that some software could not simply be recompiled; it required changes to make it work on processors of either endianness.

=== P.A. Semi's G5 derivative ===
When P.A. Semi announced the preliminary pre-production plan of PWRficient processor, there had been persistent rumors that Apple would prepare for its use in its professional line of personal computers.

In 2006, The Register reported that P.A. Semi had formed a tight relationship with Apple, which would result in P.A. Semi promptly delivering processor chips for Apple's personal computer notebook line and possibly desktops. Even in 2006, Apple did not have a laptop version of the G5 processor. The processor that would run the personal computers was P.A. Semi's preliminarily proposed processor, PWRficient 1682M (PA6T-1682M). The version that would be sampled for pre-production at third quarter of 2006 was a 2 GHz, dual-core CPU with two DDR2 memory controllers, 2 MB of L2 cache, and support for 8 PCI Express lanes. The sampled chip also has lower heat intensity than Intel's Core Duo, which gives off 9–31 W under normal load.

According to The Register article, P.A. Semi executives believed that they were all but assured of winning Apple's contract, and CEO Dan Dobberpuhl thought that Apple's hints of moving to Intel were just a persuading tactic. At the time, the companies were working for PWRficient software.

Despite the advantages of more compatible architecture, Apple moved to the Intel architecture officially for 'performance-per-watt' reasons. However, P.A. Semi would not be able to ship its low-power multicore product in volume until 2007, which, combined with P.A. Semi's status as a start-up company, seems to have been the final blow to the development of Power Mac computers. However, it was also speculated that Apple switched to Intel processor because Apple could no longer abide the constant delays in performance ramp up, desired native Windows compatibility, or it was Apple's strategy to shift its business focus away from desktop computing to iPod (and subsequently iOS) development.

Apple acquired P.A. Semi in 2008, using P.A. Semi's engineering resources to develop ARM CPUs for their iPhone, iPod Touch, iPad, and Apple TV product lines; and would go on to eventually come full circle with these designs replacing Intel chips in Macs in 2020.

The PA6T-1682M processor would later be used by the AmigaOne X1000 personal computer.

== Transition process ==
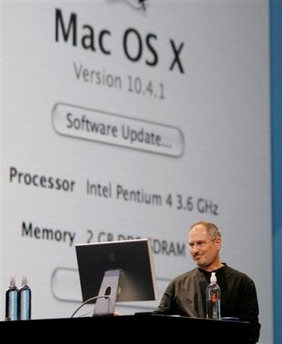
Steve Jobs reveals Mac OS X running on Pentium 4 hardware.

=== 2005 ===
During Apple's 2005 WWDC, the company introduced a Developer Transition Kit consisting of a prototype Intel-based Mac computer, along with preliminary versions of Mac OS X Tiger and Xcode, which allowed developers to prepare future versions of their software to run on both PowerPC and Intel-based Macs.

To allow apps built for PowerPC-based Macs to run on Intel-based Macs without recompilation, a dynamic binary translation software called Rosetta was created.

=== 2006 ===
On January 10, Apple unveiled an Intel-based iMac, as well as a 15-inch MacBook Pro laptop, which replaced the similarly sized PowerBook.

On February 28, a Mac mini featuring an Intel Core Duo processor was unveiled.

On April 5, the dual-boot software Boot Camp was released as a trial version, which allowed Intel-based Mac owners to run Mac OS X and Microsoft Windows.

On April 24, a MacBook Pro replacement for the 17-inch PowerBook was announced.

On May 16, a replacement for the iBook, called MacBook, was announced, thus completing the transition of Apple's laptop line to Intel processors.

On July 5, a replacement for the eMac, a special configuration of a 17-inch iMac for use in education, was announced.

On August 7, Apple unveiled a replacement for the PowerMac, Mac Pro, and an Intel-based version of Xserve. The unveiling of the Mac Pro was touted by Apple as a completion of its transition to Intel, and said the entire process took 210 days.

=== Ongoing support for PowerPC following transition ===
Mac OS X Snow Leopard (10.6), released in August 2009, was the first version of Mac OS X (later macOS) to require a Mac with an Intel processor, ending operating system support for PowerPC Macs three years after the transition was complete. Support for Rosetta was removed from Mac OS X with the release of 10.7 Lion, which was released in July 2011, five years after the transition was complete. The last Apple application to support PowerPC processors was iTunes 10.6.3, which was released on June 11, 2012.

Apple has a policy of placing products that have not been sold for more than five years, but less than seven years, as "vintage", meaning hardware services from Apple Stores and service providers are subject to availability of inventory, or as required by law. After a product has not been sold for more than seven years, it is considered "obsolete", meaning it is not eligible for hardware support. All PowerPC-based Macs were obsolete by 2013.

In spite of the PowerPC machines being considered obsolete, use of the systems remains popular in retrocomputing; multiple community projects exist that aim to allow PowerPC Macs to carry out modern tasks, such as the Classilla and TenFourFox web browsers.

== Legacy ==
A Mashable article in 2016 noted that the decision to switch to Intel processors gave many people who wanted a Mac, but couldn't commit to giving up Windows, a way to have both via Boot Camp and a number of virtualization programs, and that Mac, as a computer platform, had a renaissance following the transition, with more apps being developed. The article also said following the transition to Intel, Mac, while still outsold by Windows and other computer systems, has had a remarkable comeback, and also noted that Mac users tend to be loyal to the Apple ecosystem, which leads to purchases of other Apple products such as iPad, iPhone and Apple Watch.

On June 22, 2020, Apple announced plans to transition its Mac line to ARM processors over a two-year period, following a roadmap similar to the Intel transition, including universal binaries and a Rosetta 2 compatibility program. Apple had been using ARM processors in the iPhone since 2007, and had been using them in the iPad, iPod Touch, Apple TV, and Apple Watch as well, and had been designing its own ARM processors since the Apple A6 in 2012.

== Timeline ==
- June 6, 2005: Apple announced its plans to switch to Intel processors at the Worldwide Developer Conference and released a Developer Transition System, a PC running an Intel build of Mac OS X 10.4.1 in a modified Power Mac G5 case, to all Select and Premier members of the Apple Developer Connection at a price of $999.
- January 10, 2006: Jobs announced the first two computers in this series, the 15" MacBook Pro, the first laptop to support SATA, and iMac Core Duo line, both using an Intel Core Duo chip and offered to trade in the Developer Transition Kits for iMacs.
- February 28, 2006: Jobs announced that the Mac mini now also comes with SATA connection and an Intel Core chip, in either the Solo or Duo varieties.
- April 5, 2006: Apple announced the release of Boot Camp, which allowed users of Intel-based Macs to run Windows XP (later versions of Boot Camp allow later versions of Windows).
- April 24, 2006: Apple announced the 17" MacBook Pro, replacing the 17" PowerBook.
- April 27, 2006: Intel announced that processors with the Core microarchitecture would be released months sooner than previously thought.
- May 16, 2006: Apple announced the 13" MacBook with SATA support, replacing both the iBook line and the 12" PowerBook.
- June 26, 2006: Intel announced the Xeon 5100 series server/workstation CPU.
- July 5, 2006: Apple announced a special educational configuration of the iMac, replacing the old G4 eMac.
- August 7, 2006: "Transition Complete" - Apple announced the Intel-based Mac Pro and Xserve, replacing the Power Mac G5 and Xserve G5, at the Worldwide Developers Conference; both use the Xeon 5100 series ("Woodcrest") processors.
- October 26, 2007: Apple shipped Mac OS X 10.5 "Leopard", the final release with PowerPC support. Macs using a G3 processor cannot boot this operating system as the backwards compatibility with them have been removed, only G4 and G5 processors with a minimum 867 MHz clock speed are supported. Although it runs on PowerPC machines, it omits the Classic environment, ending Apple's support of software for the classic Mac OS.
- August 28, 2009: Apple shipped Mac OS X 10.6 "Snow Leopard" exclusively for Intel Macs. PowerPC Macs cannot boot this OS as the backwards compatibility with them have been removed. This is also the final release with Rosetta, allowing PowerPC software to run on an Intel Mac.
- March 1, 2011: The beta version of the then-upcoming Mac OS X Lion removed "Rosetta" and lost the ability to run PowerPC based software.
- June 23, 2011: Support for Mac OS 10.5 Leopard came to a end, formally ending Apple's support of PowerPC hardware on Mac OS X.
- July 20, 2011: The release of Mac OS X 10.7 Lion formally ended Apple's development of PowerPC-based software.
- August 7, 2011: PowerPC hardware reached "vintage" status having been discontinued five years prior, ending most of Apple's service and parts support for PowerPC hardware.
- June 11, 2012: Apple released iTunes 10.6.3, their last application with support for PowerPC processors.
- August 7, 2013: PowerPC hardware reached "obsolete" status having been discontinued seven years prior, ending all of Apple's service and parts support for PowerPC hardware.
- February 25, 2014: Support for Mac OS X 10.6 Snow Leopard was dropped, formally ending Apple's support of PowerPC-based software.

== See also ==
- Hackintosh
- List of Mac models grouped by CPU type
