= David Nagel =

American manager

- Education: PhD, Perception and Mathematical Psychology, UCLA MS 1968, Engineering, UCLA BS 1966, Engineering, UCLA

David Nagel is an American manager. He held executive positions in a wide variety of technology companies and organizations.

== Career ==
From 1972 to 1988, Nagel was at NASA, culminating as head of human factors research. He was co-editor of the 1988 book Human Factors in Aviation. He then joined Apple, where he was senior vice president leading the worldwide research and development group responsible for Mac OS software, especially the Copland project, Macintosh hardware, imaging and other peripheral products development. He resigned from Apple and joined AT&T in April 1996, staying there for five years. Nagel was the chief technology officer at AT&T and president of AT&T Labs. In 2001, he joined Palm, first as a member of the Palm Board of Directors and then as the first CEO of PalmSource. Since 2005 he has remained active in the technology industry as a director of several companies and as a venture capital investor.

== Memberships ==
- Member, National Research Council Study Group on IT R&D Infrastructure
- Member, Board of Directors, Liberate, Inc.
- Member, Board of Directors, Arcsoft
- Member, Board of Trustees, UCLA Foundation
- Emeritus Member, Board of the Tech Museum in San Jose, California
- Member, President Clinton's first Advisory Committee on High Performance Computing, Communication, and the Next Generation Internet, 1997
- Member, Federal Communications Commission's Technological Advisory Council, 1999
