= Apple HD SC Setup =

- Screenshot of Apple HD SC Setup
- Developer: Apple Inc.
- Release: September 1986
- Stable release: 7.3.5 / April 5, 1995
- Operating system: Classic Mac OS, A/UX
- Type: Utility
- License: Proprietary

Apple HD SC Setup is a small software utility that was bundled with various versions of the classic Mac OS and A/UX operating systems made by Apple Computer. Introduced with Apple's first SCSI hard drive, the Hard Disk 20SC in September 1986, Apple HD SC Setup can update drivers and partition and initialize hard disks. It was often used when reinstalling the operating system of an Apple Macintosh computer, or to repair corrupt partition information on a SCSI hard disk. Prior to its introduction, the formatting of disks was handled exclusively by the Mac's Finder application, or by third-party formatting utility software customized for a specific disk drive.

The version of Apple HD SC Setup that shipped with the classic Mac OS was only able to manipulate hard disks that featured Apple ROMs. Versions of the program that were bundled with A/UX, however, could be used with any SCSI disk. A third-party patch was released enabling standard editions of Apple HD SC Setup to work on any SCSI disk.

In the mid-1990s, when Apple began shipping computers using ATA hard drives, Apple HD SC Setup was joined by Internal HD Format, which could only format IDE drives. Eventually, both Internal HD Format and Apple HD SC Setup were superseded with Drive Setup in 1995, which combined SCSI and IDE formatting abilities, and ultimately by Disk Utility in macOS.
