= Multiprocessing Services =

Component of Classic Mac OS

In computing, Multiprocessing Services is a component of the Classic Mac OS and the retired Carbon API allowing programs to perform work across multiple preemptively scheduled threads of execution.

== Release history ==
Multiprocessing Services was introduced in 1996 with the release of System 7.5.3.

Multiprocessing Services 2.0, introduced in Mac OS 8.6, is a backwards-compatible major release that increases the level of integration preemptive tasks have with the rest of the system.

Multiprocessing Services 2.1, introduced in Mac OS 9, adds support for devices with more than 1 GB of RAM.

== In the Classic Mac OS ==
In the Classic Mac OS, Multiprocessing Services is not the only threading mechanism; cooperatively scheduled threads can be created with the Thread Manager. While applications using Multiprocessing Services have their threads preemptively scheduled, the application as a whole is still cooperatively scheduled with other running applications. Non-Multiprocessing Services tasks remain scheduled on a single processor, and tasks using the Macintosh Toolbox cannot be preemptively scheduled.

When a process uses Multiprocessing Services, in addition to the preemptive tasks it creates, an additional task exists, deth, which waits for other tasks created by the process to terminate and cleans up their resources when they do.

== In macOS ==
In macOS, Multiprocessing Services is implemented using POSIX threads. Applications using Multiprocessing Services are preemptively scheduled with other tasks running on the system. Multiprocessing tasks are distinct from Mach tasks.

In OS X 10.8, Multiprocessing Services was deprecated with the rest of Carbon, with Grand Central Dispatch suggested as a replacement. In macOS 10.15, support for Multiprocessing Services ended with the removal of 32-bit application support, which included all Carbon applications.
