= Mac OS 8 =

1997 operating system version

- Version of the Classic Mac OS operating system
- Screenshot of Mac OS 8.1
- Developer: Apple Computer
- OS family: Macintosh
- Working state: Historic, unsupported
- Source model: Closed source
- Released to manufacturing: July 26, 1997; 29 years ago
- Latest release: 8.6 / May 10, 1999; 27 years ago
- Supported platforms: PowerPC, Motorola 68k series (until 8.5)
- Kernel type: Monolithic (68k), nanokernel (PowerPC)
- Default user interface: Apple Platinum
- License: Proprietary
- Preceded by: System 7
- Succeeded by: Mac OS 9
- Official website: Apple - Products - Mac OS 8.6 at the Wayback Machine (archived September 22, 1999)
- Tagline: Mac OS 8-8.1: A new look. A new feel. A dramatically new experience. Mac OS 8.5-8.6: Faster. Smarter. Far more clever.

Support status
- Historical, unsupported as of May 2001

Mac OS 8 is the eighth major release of the classic Mac OS operating system for Macintosh computers, released by Apple Computer on July 26, 1997. It includes the largest overhaul of the classic Mac OS experience since the release of System 7, approximately six years before. It places a greater emphasis on color than prior versions. Released over a series of updates, Mac OS 8 represents an incremental integration of many of the technologies that had been developed from 1988 to 1996 for Apple's ambitious OS named Copland. Mac OS 8 helped modernize the Mac OS while Apple developed its next-generation operating system, Mac OS X (renamed in 2012 to OS X and then in 2016 to macOS).

Mac OS 8 is one of Apple's most commercially successful software releases, selling over 1.2 million copies in the first two weeks. As it came at a difficult time in Apple's history, many pirate groups refused to traffic in the new OS, encouraging people to buy it instead.

Mac OS 8.0 introduces the most visible changes in the lineup, including the Platinum interface and a native PowerPC multithreaded Finder. Mac OS 8.1 introduces a new, more efficient file system named HFS Plus. Mac OS 8.5 is the first version of the Mac OS to require a PowerPC processor. It features PowerPC native versions of QuickDraw, AppleScript, and the Sherlock search utility. Its successor, Mac OS 9, was released on October 23, 1999.

== Copland ==
Starting in 1988, Apple's next-generation operating system, which it originally envisioned to be "System 8" was codenamed Copland. It was announced in March 1994 alongside the introduction of the first PowerPC Macs. Apple intended Copland as a fully modern system, including native PowerPC code, intelligent agents, a microkernel, a customizable interface named Appearance Manager, a hardware abstraction layer, and a relational database integrated into the Finder. Copland was to be followed by Gershwin, which promised memory protection spaces and full preemptive multitasking. The system was intended to be a full rewrite of the Mac OS, and Apple hoped to beat Microsoft Windows 95 to market with a development cycle of only one year.

The Copland development was hampered by many missed deadlines. The release date was first pushed back to the end of 1995, then to mid-1996, late 1996, and finally to the end of 1997. With a dedicated team of 500 software engineers and an annual budget of $250 million, Apple executives began to grow impatient with the project continually falling behind schedule. In August 1996, Apple chief technology officer Ellen Hancock froze development of Copland and Apple began a search for an operating system developed outside the company. This ultimately led to Apple buying NeXT and developing Rhapsody, which would eventually evolve into Mac OS X in 2001 (now named macOS).

At the Worldwide Developers Conference in January 1997, Apple chief executive officer (CEO) Gil Amelio announced that, rather than release Copland as one monolithic release, Copland features would be phased into the Mac OS following a six-month release cycle. These updates began with Mac OS 7.6, released during WWDC. Mac OS 8.0, released six months later, continued to integrate Copland technologies into the Mac OS.

== Mac OS 8.0 ==
Developed with the codename "Tempo", Mac OS 8.0 was announced on July 22, 1997, and released on July 26. The early beta releases of the product that were circulated to developers and Apple internal audiences were branded as Mac OS 7.7, superseding the then-current release, Mac OS 7.6. The software was renamed Mac OS 8 before final release.

Major changes in this version included the Platinum theme, a Finder that was PowerPC-native and multithreaded, and greater customization of the user interface.

Other features introduced in Mac OS 8.0 include the following:

- Customization of system fonts and increased use of the user-set accent color.
- Pop-up context menus, accessed via ctrl-click with a one-button mouse.
- Pop-up (or tabbed) windows in the Finder.
- Spring-loaded folders.
- Live scrolling.
- WindowShade widget in window titlebars.
- Multithreaded Finder — file copy operations run in a separate thread and don't block the Finder UI.
- Redesigned color picker.
- Desktop Pictures control panel, allowing photographs to be set as the desktop background; not only tiled patterns.
- Simple Finder, an option that reduces Finder menus to basic operations, to avoid overwhelming new users.
- Relocation of the 'Help' menu from an icon at the right end of the menu bar to a standard textual menu positioned after the application's menus.
- A faster Apple Guide, featuring HTML help pages.
- Native support of Apple Filing Protocol over IP.
- Performance improvements to virtual memory, AppleScript execution and system startup times.
- Faster desktop rebuilding.

Support was removed for 68k processors earlier than the 68040, however utilities such as Born Again allow many Macs with older 68030 processors to circumvent the limitation.

Apple sold the Mac OS 8 update for US$99 (equivalent to $199 in 2025).

== Mac OS 8.1 ==
Released on January 19, 1998, Mac OS 8.1 was the last version of the Mac OS to run on Macs with Motorola 68000 series processors. It addressed performance and reliability improvements. It introduced a new file system named HFS+, also named Mac OS Extended, which supported large file sizes and made more efficient use of larger hard drives via using a smaller block size. To upgrade, users must reformat the hard drive, which deletes the entire contents of the drive. Some third-party utilities later appeared that preserved the user's data while upgrading to HFS+. The 68040 systems do not support booting from HFS+ disks; the boot drive must be HFS.

Mac OS 8.1 was the first system to have a Universal Disk Format (UDF) driver, (Note: Read and write version support for UDF version 1.02 only. Some earlier versions of the operating system could support UDF via third-party utilities as far back as 7.5, along with additional UDF version support. Future versions of UDF were not officially supported until 8.6.) allowing for DVD support on the Mac for the first time. It also shipped with the new Java runtime (JDK 1.1.3).

Mac OS 8.1 also included an enhanced version of PC Exchange, allowing Macintosh users to see the long file names (up to 255 characters) on files that were created on PCs running Microsoft Windows, and supporting FAT32.

Mac OS 8.1 is the earliest version of the Mac OS that can run Carbon applications. Carbon support requires a PowerPC processor and installation of the CarbonLib software from Apple's website; it is not a standard component of Mac OS 8.1. Applications needing later versions of CarbonLib will not run on Mac OS 8.1. More recent versions of CarbonLib require Mac OS 8.6.

As part of Apple's agreement with Microsoft, 8.1 included Internet Explorer 3 initially, but soon switched to Internet Explorer 4 as its default browser.

Mac OS 8.1 was free for Mac OS 8 owners and was available in February 1998 via the apple.com website.

== Mac OS 8.5 ==
Released October 16, 1998, Mac OS 8.5 was the first version of the Mac OS to run solely on Macs equipped with a PowerPC processor. If Mac OS 8.5 is installed on a 68k system, the Sad Mac error screen will appear. As such, it replaced some, but not all, of the 680x0 code with PowerPC code, improving system performance by relying less on 680x0 emulation.

Apple sold the Mac OS 8.5 update for US$99 (equivalent to $196 in 2025).

It introduced the Sherlock search utility. This allowed users to search the contents of documents on hard drives (if the user had let it index the drive), or extend a search to the Internet. Sherlock plug-ins started appearing at this time; these allowed users to search the contents of other websites.

Mac OS 8.5 includes several performance improvements. Copying files over a network was faster than prior versions and Apple advertised it as being "faster than Windows NT". AppleScript was also rewritten to use only PowerPC code, which improved AppleScript execution speed significantly.

Font Smoothing, system-wide antialiasing for type was also introduced. The HTML format for online help, first adopted by the Finder's Info Center in Mac OS 8, was now used throughout. This made it easier for software companies to write online help systems. The PPP control panel was removed and replaced with Remote Access, which provides the same functionality but also allows connections to AppleTalk Remote Access (ARA) servers.

The installation process was simplified considerably in Mac OS 8.5. In earlier versions the installer worked in segments and often required a user to click to continue in between stages of the installation. This was a holdover from the days when the OS was distributed on multiple floppy disks, disk swapping promoting a natural segmentation model. The Mac OS 8.5 installer generally required very little user interaction once it was started. Customisation options were also much more detailed yet simpler to manage.

From Mac OS 8.5 onward, MacLinkPlus document translation software is no longer bundled as part of the Mac OS.

Mac OS 8.5 was the first version of the Mac OS to support themes, or skins, which could change the default Apple Platinum look of the Mac OS to "Gizmo" or "HiTech" themes. This radical changing of the computer's appearance was removed at the last minute, and appeared only in beta versions, though users could still make (and share) their own themes and use them with the OS. The Appearance control panel was also updated to support proportional scroll bars, and added the option for both scroll arrows to be placed at the bottom of a scroll bar.

Along with themes support, 8.5 was the first version to support 32-bit icons. Icons now had 24-bit color (16.7 million colors) and an 8-bit alpha channel, allowing for transparency-translucency effects.

The application palette made its debut with 8.5 – the application menu at the right side of the menu bar could be resized to show the active application's name, or 'torn off' into a palette of buttons. This palette could be customized in many ways, by removing the window frame and changing the size and layout of the buttons. Apple provided no user interface to set these options, instead making them available via AppleScript and Apple Events and relying on third parties to provide a user interface for the task. By setting it to display horizontally and turning off the window border, the palette's look and function could be configured to resemble the Windows 95 task bar.

=== Mac OS 8.5.1 ===
Mac OS 8.5.1, released December 7, 1998, was a minor update to Mac OS 8.5 that fixes several bugs that caused crashes and data corruption. It was codenamed Ric Ford after the publisher of Macintouch.

== Mac OS 8.6 ==
Mac OS 8.6 was released on May 10, 1999, as a free update for Mac users running 8.5 and 8.5.1. It added support to the Mac OS nanokernel to handle preemptive tasks via the Multiprocessing Services 2.x and later developer API. Mac OS 8.6 improved PowerBook battery life, added Sherlock 2.1, and is faster and much more stable than either version of 8.5.x. It is the first version of Mac OS to display the version number as part of the startup screen. Nonetheless, there is no process separation; the system still uses cooperative multitasking between processes, and even a process that is Multiprocessing Services-aware still has a portion that runs in the "blue task", which also runs all programs that are unaware of it, and was the only task that can run 68k code.

== Reception ==
While CNET's initial review of Mac OS 8 was more circumspect, its editorial staff named it one of the best products of 1997 in their year-end roundup. MacHome Journal said "OS 8 is a substantial upgrade with greatly enhanced capabilities, particularly for Power Macs. It isn't simply a minor bug fix, as the fractional upgrades to System 7 have been, so it should be high on your list of scheduled software purchases".

== Versions ==
Version	Release date	Changes	Codename	Price
8.0	July 26, 1997	Initial release.	Tempo	US$99
8.1	January 19, 1998	Added HFS+ file system.	Bride of Buster	Free
8.5	October 17, 1998	PowerPC required. Added Sherlock, themes and 32-bit icons.	Allegro	US$99
8.5.1	December 7, 1998	Crash, memory leaks and data corruption fixes.	Ric Ford	Free
8.6	May 10, 1999	Added nanokernel to support Multiprocessing Services 2.0, battery life improvement.	Veronica	Free

== Compatibility ==
Macintosh model	8.0	8.1	8.5	8.6
All Centris / Quadra machines	Yes		No	
Macintosh LC 475, 575, 580	Yes		No	
PowerBook 190	Yes		No	
PowerBook 520	Yes		No	
PowerBook 540	Yes		No	
PowerBook Duo 2300	Yes			
PowerBook 5300	Yes			
PowerBook 1400	Yes			
PowerBook 2400	Yes			
PowerBook 3400	Yes			
Power Macintosh 4400	Yes			
Power Macintosh 5200	Yes			
Power Macintosh 5300	Yes			
Power Macintosh 5400	Yes			
Power Macintosh 5500	Yes			
Power Macintosh 6100	Yes			
Power Macintosh 6200	Yes			
Power Macintosh 6300	Yes			
Power Macintosh 6400	Yes			
Power Macintosh 6500	Yes			
Power Macintosh 7100	Yes			
Power Macintosh 7200	Yes			
Power Macintosh 7300	Yes			
Power Macintosh 7500	Yes			
Power Macintosh 8100	Yes			
Power Macintosh 8500	Yes			
Power Macintosh 9500	Yes			
Power Macintosh 7600	Yes			
Power Macintosh 8600	Yes			
Power Macintosh 9600	Yes			
Twentieth Anniversary Macintosh	Yes			
Power Macintosh G3 All-In-One
Power Macintosh G3	Yes: machine-specific version only	Yes		
PowerBook G3	No	Yes		
iMac G3	No	Yes: machine-specific version only	Yes	
iMac G3 (266 MHz, 333 MHz)	No	No	Yes	
Power Macintosh G3 Blue and White	No	No	Yes: machine-specific version only	Yes
iMac G3 (Slot Loading)	No	No	No	Yes: machine-specific version only
Power Macintosh G4 (PCI Graphics)	No	No	No	Yes: machine-specific version only
Power Macintosh G4 (AGP Graphics)	No	No	No	Yes: machine-specific version only
iBook	No	No	No	Yes: machine-specific version only

== See also ==
- List of Apple operating systems

Timeline of Mac operating systems

== Notes ==
Preceded by Mac OS 7	Mac OS 8; 1997	Succeeded by Mac OS 9
