= Mac 68k emulator =

Software emulator built into classic Mac OS for PowerPC

The Mac 68k emulator is a software emulator built into all versions of the classic Mac OS for PowerPC. This emulator enabled running applications and system code that were originally written for the 680x0-based Macintosh models. With a few exceptions, notably Connectix's RAM Doubler, the emulator ran all software with no noticeable impact other than lower performance relative to the same program when compiled for PowerPC.

== Origins ==
The first version was written by Gary Davidian, who had originally created it for use on the Motorola 88000 CPU, used in Apple's abortive first attempt at a RISC target platform. A later version, using dynamic recompilation, was developed by Eric Traut, who later worked on successful emulation projects at Connectix such as Virtual Game Station and Virtual PC. Prior to Traut's arrival there, Connectix had released Speed Doubler, which included an even faster PowerPC 68k emulator.

== Implementation ==
All versions of this emulator emulated the "user" subset of the 68EC040 instruction set with a 68020/68030 exception stack frame. Apple developer documents indicate that the emulator provided an operating environment most closely resembling that of the Macintosh Centris 610, a system based on the Motorola 68LC040 microprocessor. Early versions emulated it by decoding each instruction and immediately carrying out a series of equivalent PowerPC instructions. For the PCI PowerMacs, the dynamic recompilation emulator was used to boost performance. Dynamic recompilation works by "recompiling" common sections of the code into faster, PowerPC-native, sequences that were locally cached. The emulator could recognise the same sequence of 680x0 code and run the previously-cached PowerPC code to avoid doing the translation again. This emulator was theoretically capable of emulating 680x0 code faster than any real 680x0 was capable of running it. The 68LC040 had no floating point instructions, making this feat slightly simpler but no less impressive.

One reason that this emulation was so successful is that many of the APIs for the Mac OS were originally implemented as traps on the 680x0 processor; therefore, calling an API actually was recognised by the 680x0 as the equivalent of an error condition, which would cause it to handle that error through one of its hardware vectors. In turn, this vector would look up and run the operating system routine from ROM or RAM. In the emulator, such traps could be replaced by native PowerPC code, so the only code being emulated was the application itself, and any system API it called could be accelerated with native PowerPC code. This also allowed Apple time to port the OS to the PowerPC. At first only time-critical aspects were rewritten in native code, leaving much of the OS emulated. Gradually most of the OS was rewritten to be native, so the OS got faster over time.

For the programmer, the transition to the PowerPC was made fairly painless, because the emulator was started and stopped automatically. This was achieved using a new type of pointer called a Universal Procedure Pointer (UPP). For 68k code, this pointer appeared to be an ordinary pointer to code and could be used as such. However, it actually led to a data structure which contained a special trap instruction and flags indicating the instruction set architecture (ISA) of the called code. From PowerPC code, this UPP could be passed to the CallUniversalProc( ) function to call it. The 68k emulator then dealt with details such as presenting passed parameters in the right order for the ISA in question, as well as starting and stopping the emulator as required. The compilers for Mac OS created such UPPs automatically when the proper macros were used, and the PowerPC system libraries contained native stubs to transparently call through to native or still-68k functions as needed. This meant that dealing with the dual architecture required very little work for the programmer, and just like the OS, applications themselves could mix and match 680x0 and PowerPC code fairly easily.

== Current status ==
Because it was built into all PowerPC versions of the classic Mac OS, the emulator was also part of the Classic environment in Mac OS X. PowerPC Macintosh emulators such as SheepShaver therefore use the emulator as well when running the classic Mac OS. Native Mac OS X outside of Classic never used the emulator.

== See also ==
- Mac OS nanokernel
- Alpha Microsystems for a similar architecture to run 68k code on x86
- Rosetta, a similar feature in Mac OS X that translates PowerPC instructions to x86 instructions, and later, x86 instructions to ARM instructions
