= Appearance Manager =

Component of Mac OS 8 and Mac OS 9

The Appearance Manager is a component of Mac OS 8 and Mac OS 9 that controls the overall look of the Macintosh graphical user interface widgets and supports several themes. It was originally developed for Apple's ill-fated Copland project, but with the cancellation of this project the system was moved into newer versions of the Mac OS. The Appearance Manager is also available free as part of a downloadable SDK for System 7.

The Appearance Manager is implemented as an abstraction layer between the Control Manager and QuickDraw. Previously, controls made direct QuickDraw calls to draw user interface elements such as buttons, scrollbars, window title bars, etc. With the Appearance Manager, these elements are abstracted into a series of APIs that draw the item as a distinct entity on behalf of the client code, thus relieving the Control Manager of the task. This extra level of indirection allows the system to support the concept of switchable "themes", since client code simply requests the image of an interface element (a button or scroll bar, for example) and draws its appearance. Kaleidoscope, a 3rd party application, was the first to utilize this functionality with via "scheme" files, followed by an updated Appearance Control Panel in Mac OS 8.5, which acted similarly via "theme" files. Schemes and themes are similar in concept, but they are not internally compatible.

An updated and more powerful version of the Appearance Manager was used for Carbon applications in Mac OS X even after Apple made the transition to Aqua. The Extras.rsrc file is an updated version of an Appearance Theme that is compatible with the newer Appearance Manager. As of Mac OS X version 10.3, 'layo' data is no longer used, even for Carbon applications, so the continued existence of the Appearance Manager can no longer be confirmed.

== Appearance themes ==
Platinum in Copland

The default look and feel of the Appearance Manager in Mac OS 8 and 9 is Platinum design language, which was intended to be the primary GUI for Copland. Platinum retains many of the shapes and positions of elements from System 7 and earlier, like window control widgets and buttons and while Charcoal is the default system font, Chicago was available via a menu option. However, various shades of grey are used extensively throughout the interface, as opposed to previous interfaces which are mostly monochrome black and white. Apple Platinum is not a theme, however, as it is actually embedded into the Appearance Manager. The Appearance Control Panel has the ability to attach a theme to the Appearance Manager. There is an Apple Platinum file in the themes folder in the System Folder which acts as a stub, but no functional theme elements are embedded into it. Customizable palettes ('clut' resources) are used for progress bars, scroll thumbs, slider tabs and menu selections in Apple Platinum and this unique option is not available to real themes. The Appearance Control Panel uses the type code 'pltn' to identify if a file should act like a palette modification stub to Apple Platinum and the type code 'thme' to identify if a file should act like an Appearance Theme. An important distinction is that the Appearance Control Panel implements themes into the Appearance Manager. Kaleidoscope is third-party software that implements schemes into the Appearance Manager. Kaleidoscope is not a substitute for the Appearance Manager; it is a substitute for the Appearance Control Panel.

Apple widely demonstrated two Appearance Themes which override Apple Platinum, Hi-Tech and Gizmo. Hi-Tech is based on a shades-of-black color scheme that made the interface look like a contemporary piece of audio-visual equipment. Gizmo is a period-appropriate Memphis-style interface, using many bold colors, patterns, and "wiggly" interface elements. Both changed every single element of the overall GUI, leaving no trace of Apple Platinum. A third theme, Drawing Board, was later introduced, developed at Apple Japan. This theme uses elements that make the interface look like it has been drawn in pencil on a drafting board, including small "pencil marks" around the windows, a barely visible graph paper grid on the desktop, and "squarish" elements with low contrast. Although themes are supported in all released versions of Mac OS 8.5 through 9.2.2, the three aforementioned themes were only present in pre-release versions of Mac OS 8.5 and were removed without explanation in the final release.

One retrospective review by a long-time Mac user described the themes as being a mistake and waste of engineering resources, saying the "Hi-Tech" theme "looked like a typical dark over-decorated techno skin that became popular for Linux desktops" and that "Gizmo" looked "awful...the Finder in a clown suit".

== Typography ==
By default, a font called Charcoal is used to replace the similar Chicago typeface that was used in earlier versions of the Mac OS. A number of additional system fonts are also provided, including Capitals, Gadget, Sand, Techno, and Textile. In order to be a system font, glyphs specific to the Mac operating system need to be provided, such as the Command key symbol (⌘). System fonts are normally displayed at 12 points.

Later versions of the Appearance Manager also apply anti-aliasing to type displayed on the screen above a certain size, by default 12 points. This improves the overall look of the text by reducing the perception of rasterization artifacts. Anti-aliasing is adjustable in the Appearance Control Panel.

== Shareware products ==
Shareware products exist that provided some features of the Appearance Manager before they were offered directly in the Appearance Control Panel. Church Windows and Décor provide desktop picture functionality. WindowShade, which had been purchased by Apple and bundled with System 7.5, provides collapse functionality. When windows collapse, they "roll up", leaving only the title bar.

=== Kaleidoscope ===
Kaleidoscope theme utility using Albie Wong's ElectricMonk scheme, running on Mac OS 9 in 2001

Kaleidoscope, written by Arlo Rose and Greg Landweber, applied "schemes" to the GUI before Apple released an update to the Appearance Control Panel with Mac OS 8.5 which provides similar functionality using "themes". Whereas only a handful of themes were ever developed, thousands of Kaleidoscope schemes were developed.

When theme support in the Appearance Control Panel was first announced, the team responsible for it demonstrated an automatic tool specifically designed to convert the tens of thousands of existing Kaleidoscope scheme files into Appearance Manager-compatible theme files. This tool was not released to the public; however, a similar tool has been developed.

Kaleidoscope remained the primary theming platform, even after the Appearance Control Panel offered theming capabilities in Mac OS 8.5. Steve Jobs returned to Apple just before the release of Mac OS 8.5, and he decided to officially drop support for themes because he wanted to preserve a consistent user interface. Because of this, Apple released little documentation for the theme format, withheld their own beta-released themes, and even issued a cease and desist notice to the authors of a third-party theme editor on grounds that it was intended to allow users to create themes that imitate the Aqua interface in Mac OS X. At the same time, the format of Kaleidoscope schemes continued to evolve. As a result, Kaleidoscope schemes proliferated while Appearance themes never really took off. Kaleidoscope was only rendered obsolete with the transition to Mac OS X, with which Kaleidoscope is not compatible.
