= Classic Mac OS =

Apple operating systems from 1984 to 2001

- Developer: Apple Computer
- OS family: Macintosh
- Working state: Historic, unsupported as of 2002
- Source model: Closed source
- Initial release: January 24, 1984; 42 years ago
- Final release: 9.2.2 / December 5, 2001; 24 years ago
- Marketing target: Personal computing
- Supported platforms: Motorola 68k (1.0–8.1); PowerPC (7.1.2–9.2.2)
- Kernel type: Monolithic for 68k, nanokernel for PowerPC
- Default user interface: Graphical
- License: Commercial software, proprietary software
- Succeeded by: Mac OS X

Support status
- Historical, unsupported as of February 1, 2002

Mac OS (originally System Software; retronymically Classic Mac OS (Note: The retronym "Classic Mac OS" was coined after the introduction of Mac OS X.)) is a discontinued series of operating systems developed for the Motorola 68k and PowerPC architectures. It is owned by Apple Computer, Inc. and developed from 1984 to 2001. The Macintosh operating system is credited for having popularized the graphical user interface concept. It was included with every Macintosh that Apple sold from 1984 and provided system updates in conjunction with the introduction of new Macintosh systems.

Apple released the original Macintosh on January 24, 1984. Internally called Lisa II, the Macintosh set many of the computer standard that the industry takes for granted. The first system software Apple developed was partially based on the Lisa OS, which Apple previously released in 1983. As part of an agreement allowing Xerox to buy shares in Apple in exchange with marketing and software rights for its hardware. This operating system consisted of the Macintosh Toolbox ROM and the "System Folder", a set of files that were loaded from disk. The name Macintosh System Software came into use in 1996, starting officially due in part to its Macintosh clone program. That program ended after the release of Mac OS in 2001, last major release for the 68k architecture.

Initial versions of the System Software ran one application at a time. With the Macintosh 512K, a system extension called the Switcher was developed to use this additional memory to allow multiple programs to remain loaded. With the Switcher, the now familiar Clipboard feature allowed copy and paste between the loaded programs across switches including the desktop.

With the introduction of a cooperative multitasking extension called MultiFinder that was later integrated into System 7, it changed the way people used their computers. By the mid-1990s, however, contemporary operating systems brought pre-emptive multitasking, protected memory, access controls, and multi-user capabilities to desktop computers. The Macintosh's limited memory management and susceptibility to conflicts among extensions that provide additional functionality, such as networking or support for a particular device, led to significant criticism of the operating system, and was a factor in Apple's declining market share at the time.

After two aborted attempts at creating a successor to the Macintosh System Software called Taligent and Copland, Apple replaced the System Software branding with "Mac OS", beginning with System Software 7.5.1's splash screen in March 1995, and eventually being integrated into official retail names starting with Mac OS 7.6 in January of 1997. This was originally done to separate Apple's own hardware from the Mac clone market.

Later, in 2001, Apple would release a brand-new operating system called "Mac OS X". The new operating system brought several design and usage improvements, a new metallic, silver-colored UI, while retaining the general layout and design of previous Mac OS releases to minimize confusing existing Mac OS users.

The final updates leading up to Mac OS 9.2.2 released in 2001 provided interoperability with Mac OS X. The name "Classic" that now signifies that the operating system is outdated and replaced by Mac OS X, possibly a reference to the Classic Environment, a compatibility layer that helped ease the transition to Mac OS X (also called/spelled macOS).

== Initial concept ==
The Macintosh project started in late 1978 with Jef Raskin, who envisioned an easy-to-use, low-cost computer for the average consumer. In September 1979, Raskin began looking for an engineer who could put together a prototype. Bill Atkinson, a member of the Apple Lisa team, introduced Raskin to Burrell Smith, a service technician who had been hired for that purpose.

Apple's concept was to deliberately minimize the user's awareness of the operating system. Many basic tasks could be accomplished by mouse gestures and graphic controls on a Macintosh System. This would differentiate the Macintosh from its marketplace that was dominated by IBM and DOS clones.

Former Lisa team members had previewed Xerox PC's prior to the release of Lisa/Macintosh. In January 1981, Apple completely took over the Macintosh project. A number of Apple engineers visited Xerox in December 1979 after hearing about the pioneering GUI technology being developed at its Software and Engineering division Xerox PARC. Former Xerox employees negotiated a visit to see the Xerox Alto computer and Smalltalk development tools in exchange for Apple stock options. The final Lisa and Macintosh operating systems use concepts from the Xerox Alto, but many elements of the graphical user interface were created by Apple including the menu bar, pull-down menus, and the concepts of drag and drop and direct manipulation.

Unlike MS-DOS, which used a command-line interface consisting of terse, abbreviated textual commands. The systems that used the Operating System used 8 kB of system ROM for power-on self-test (POST) and basic input/output system (BIOS), the Mac ROM is significantly larger (64 kB) and holds key OS code. Much of the original Mac ROM Systems was written by Andy Hertzfeld, a member of the original Macintosh team. He was able to write routines in assembly language code optimized with "hacks", or clever programming knowledge. In addition to the ROM, he also coded the kernel, the Macintosh Toolbox, and some of the desktop accessories (DAs).

Susan Kare System Software Demo (1984)

The icons of the operating system were designed by Susan Kare. Bruce Horn and Steve Capps wrote the Macintosh Finder, as well as a number of Macintosh system utilities. In 2025, Kare's classic Mac icons from this period were included in Pirouette: Turning Points in Design, an exhibition at the Museum of Modern Art (MoMA) featuring "widely recognized design icons [...] highlighting pivotal moments in design history." This work is also held in the museum's design collection.

Apple aggressively advertised their new machine. After its release, the company bought all 39 pages of advertisement space in the 198November 4/December edition of Newsweek magazine. The Macintosh quickly outsold its more sophisticated Apple II series computers that were much more expensive than the Mac predecessor, Lisa. Apple quickly developed MacWorks, a product that allowed the Lisa/Macintosh systems to communicate with each other. Many of the Lisa's operating system advances would not appear in the Macintosh operating system until System 7 or later.

== Architecture ==
=== Compatibility ===
Mac OS are compatible only with Motorola 68000-family. As Apple introduced computers with PowerPC hardware in the mid-1990s, the OS was ported to support this architecture.

In systems prior to PowerPC systems, significant parts of the system are stored in physical ROM. The initial purpose of this is to avoid having the OS use up most of the RAM. This architecture also allows for a completely graphical OS interface without the need for a text-only console: boot time errors, such as finding no disk drives, are communicated to the user graphically, usually with an icon or the distinctive series of beeps. This is in contrast to MS-DOS which display such messages in a mono-spaced font on a black background. To provide such niceties, Mac OS depends on core system software in ROM, which also ensured that only Apple computer (with the copyright-protected ROMs) can run Mac OS.

==== Mac clones ====
Several computer manufacturers over the years made Macintosh clones between 1995 to 1997, Apple licensed Macintosh ROMs to several companies, notably Power Computing, UMAX and Motorola. These machines normally ran System Software. Steve Jobs ended the clone-licensing program after returning to Apple in 1997.

Support for Macintosh clones was flexible; Mac OS was first made available for the clone market before their decision to end the program in 1997 when Apple changed their system architectures to the more modern PowerPC Architecture. These changes were made to disassociate the operating system from Apple's own Macintosh models.

=== File systems ===
The Macintosh originally used the Macintosh File System (MFS). This was quickly replaced in 1985 by the Hierarchical File System (HFS), which had a true directory tree. Both file systems are otherwise compatible with each other. An improved file system named HFS Plus ("HFS+" or "Mac OS Extended") first announced and implemented in 1997.

Files in most file systems have only one "fork". By contrast, MFS and HFS give files two different "forks". The data fork contains the same sort of information as a file in other file systems, such as the text of a document or the bitmaps of an image file. The resource fork contains other structured data such as menu definitions, graphics, sounds, or code segments that would be incorporated into a program's file format on other systems. An executable file might consist only of resources (including code segments) with an empty data fork, while a data file might have only a data fork with no resource fork. A word processor file could contain its text in the data fork and styling information in the resource fork so that an application that does not recognize the styling information can still read the raw text.

On the other hand, these forks would challenge interoperability with different operating systems. In copying or transferring a Mac OS file to a non-Mac system, the default implementations would strip the file of its resource fork. Most data files contained only nonessential information in their resource fork, such as window size and location, but program files would be inoperative without their resources. This necessitated such encoding schemes as BinHex and MacBinary, which allowed a user to encode a dual-forked file into a single stream, or inversely take a single stream so-encoded and reconstitute it into a dual-forked file usable by Mac OS.

== Release history ==
=== System Software ===
System 2 in April 1985

Early versions of the Macintosh operating system had no distinct name. They are now commonly referred to as System, although the names assigned to early releases were applied retrospectively, largely following the System file's version number.

These systems lacked multitasking, allowing only one application to run at a time, apart from desk accessories. Utilities such as Apple's Switcher and the third-party Multi-Mac offered ways to work around this limitation.

The software consisted of two main components: the System file, which provided core operating system functions, and the Finder, an application responsible for file management and displaying the desktop. Both were stored in a directory called the "System Folder", alongside resources such as printer drivers required by the operating system.

Systems 1.0 through 2.0 used the Macintosh File System (MFS), which did not support hierarchical directories. The Finder displayed virtual folders to help users organize files, but these folders existed only in the interface. System 2.0 added support for AppleTalk, Apple's networking protocol, and the LaserWriter printer.

System 2.1 was released with the Hard Disk 20, Apple's external hard drive, and introduced support for the Hierarchical File System (HFS).

System 3.0, released with the Macintosh Plus, expanded support for HFS and added support for 800 KB floppy disks and SCSI peripherals. Support for AppleShare, Apple's file-server software, was added in a subsequent release.

Systems 4.0 and 4.1 accompanied the Macintosh SE and Macintosh II, respectively. They added support for newer hardware, including the Apple Desktop Bus (ADB), expansion slots and internal hard drives. System 4.1 supported the Macintosh II's Motorola 68020 processor and its color-display capabilities.

In 1989, Apple Developer Group distributed a "Developer Helper" CD containing earlier system releases. The CD assigned retrospective names to combinations of System and Finder versions using a scheme described as largely arbitrary. Apple later carried these names into its documentation and support articles.

The following table lists the versions and their associated names, release dates and features.

System version	Release	Software versions		Information
System version	Release	Finder	LaserWriter	Information
1	January 24, 1984	1.0	—N/a	Initial release with the Macintosh 128K
1.1	May 5, 1984	1.1g	—N/a	Improved font support, disk copying and startup speed; added the Mountain scene, About box and Clean Up command.
2	April 8, 1985	4.1	1.0	Added LaserWriter support, New Folder and Shut Down commands, MiniFinder and screenshot capture.
2.1	September 17, 1985	5.0	1.0	Added support for the Hard Disk 20 and HFS.
3	January 16, 1986	5.1	1.0	Improved HFS support; added a RAM disk cache and window zoom boxes; redesigned the Control Panel.
3.1	February 14, 1986	5.2	1.1	Caused data corruption and was quickly superseded by 3.2. Distributed only on a Printer Installation disk; the planned system disk release did not occur.
3.2	June 2, 1986	5.3	3.1	Fixed data-loss and system-crash problems; updated Chooser and Calculator.
3.3	January 12, 1987	5.4	3.1	Distributed with AppleShare 1.0 for Macintosh 512K.
3.3	January 12, 1987	5.5	3.1	Distributed with AppleShare 1.1 for the Macintosh 512K.
3.4	April 1988	6.1	3.1	Distributed with AppleShare 2.0 for the Macintosh 512Ke.
4	March 2, 1987	5.4	3.1	Released with the Macintosh SE. Added Find File and Restart; redesigned the Control Panel and Chooser; changed the Trash icon to indicate when it contained items.
4.1	April 14, 1987	5.5	4.0	Released with the Macintosh II. Added Easy Access accessibility features and support for hard drives larger than 32 MB.

=== System Software 5 ===
Towards the end of 1987, Apple introduced a package titled "System Software Update Kit". For the first time, the Macintosh operating system was offered as an update to the operating system. Three of the four disks (System Tools 1, System Tools 2 and Utilities 1) are useful tools, and the user can boot off whichever floppy contains the tools they need. For instance, System Tools 2 is the only disk with printer drivers, and Utilities 1 is the only disk with Disk First Aid and Apple HD SC Setup. Because the disks are named System Tools, users and the press commonly referred to this version as "System Tools 5.0".

The primary new feature of System 5 is MultiFinder, an extension that lets the system run several programs at once. Users can also choose not to use MultiFinder. In 1990 InfoWorld tested four multitasking options for PC and Mac, viewing MultiFinder positively overall, but noting that its presence halved the speed of file transfers and printing compared to the single-tasking System 6 without MultiFinder.

System Software Release	Release	System version	Software versions			Information
System Software Release	Release	System version	Finder	MultiFinder	LaserWriter	Information
5.0	October 1987	4.2	6.0	1.0	5.0	Initial release
5.1	November 1987	4.3	6.0	1.0	5.1	Updated LaserWriter Driver and new version of Apple HD SC Setup

=== System Software 6 ===
System Software 6 (also referred to as "System 6") is a consolidation release. Two major hardware introductions supported the new system architecture. They were at the time called Macintosh II/Apple II Series and Macintosh SE/Classic/LC Series. Later updates included support for specialized laptops made by Apple, the first being called Macintosh Portable. From System 6 forward, the Finder has a unified version number closely matching that of the System, alleviating much of the confusion caused by earlier Systems.

On May 13, 1991, System 6 was released by Apple. It was a major upgrade over System 5, adding a significant user interface overhaul, new applications, stability improvements and many new features. Its introduction coincides with the release of and provided support for the PowerPC. The System 6 era saw numerous changes in the Macintosh platform including a proliferation of Macintosh models, the 68k to Power Macintosh transition as well as the rise of Microsoft Windows, increasing use of computer networking and the explosion in the popularity of the Internet.

One of the most significant features of System 6 is virtual memory support, an essential subsystem anticipated for years, which only exists for previous Systems. Accompanying this was a move to 32-bit ROMS, necessary for the ever-increasing amounts of RAM available to the Motorola 68k systems. This process involves making all of the routines in OS code use the full 32-bits—prior systems used the upper 8 bits. This change is known as being "32-bit clean". Many existing machines and thousands of applications were not compatible with System 6. To ease the transition, the "Memory" control panel contains a switch to disable this feature, allowing for compatibility with older applications.

Another notable feature is built-in cooperative multitasking. In System Software 6, this function was optional through the MultiFinder. System 6 also introduced aliases, similar to symbolic links on Unix, shortcuts that were introduced in later versions of Microsoft Windows, and shadows in IBM OS/2. System extensions were enhanced by being moved to their own subfolder; a subfolder in the System Folder was also created for the control panels. Apple includes the Extensions Manager, a previously third-party program that simplified the process of enabling and disabling extensions.

The Apple menu, home only to desk accessories in System 6, was made more general-purpose: the user could now make often-used folders and applications—or anything else they desired—appear in the menu by placing aliases to them in an "Apple Menu Items" subfolder of the System Folder. System 6 also introduced the following: AppleScript, a scripting language for automating tasks; 32-bit QuickDraw, supporting so-called "true color" imaging, previously available as a system extension; and TrueType, an outline font standard.

The Trash, under System 6, stores the items in cache when operating. Unlike earlier system software's where it empties itself automatically when shutting down the computer. System 6's trash allows files to remain in it across reboots until the user deliberately chooses the "Empty Trash" command.

==== System 7.0 ====
System 7.0 is mainly a bugfix release, with a few minor features added. One of the major new features of System 7.0 was installing new fonts. Instead of fonts being stored out of the System file, it is now stored into the Fonts folder. Previously a resource-copying utility such as ResEdit or Font D/A Mover was required for installing fonts. System 7.0 was called by Apple "System 7 Pro" not to confuse the market with another operating system that was also called System 7 at the time. System 7.0 was the first version to support PowerPC-based Macs.

The retail copies were sold by Apple whiles updates further on were offered for free on their website or on FTP servers provided by the Macintosh Community.

==== System 7.1/7.1 Pro ====
System 7.1 introduces a large number of new features, many of which are based on shareware applications that Apple bought and included into the new system. On the newer PowerPC machines, there may be stability problems partly due to a new memory manager and issues with the handling of errors in the PowerPC code. These issues do not affect 68k-architecture machines. System 7.1 was released as a replacement to Apple's failed Copland effort as well as to compete with Microsoft's release of Windows 95.

==== Macintosh System Software 7.5 ====
Macintosh System 7.5.3 in March 1996

Stability improved in PowerPC-based Macs with System 7.5, which dropped the "System" moniker with a more trademarkable name. This is to help reduce the confusion with the open market. Due to the growing market of third-party Macintosh clone manufacturers, this resulted in the releases of fake System 7.5 software. To stop and reduce this practice, Apple required all licensees and manufactures to use clean 32-bit ROMS for their systems in order to use the new version. Using System 7.5 on Mac clones and some earlier Macs may cause system errors and crashes.

All later releases of Mac OS required 32-bit-clean ROMs, causing Apple to drop support for every Mac with a 68000 processor, as well as the Mac II Series and Mac SE/LC/Classic Series.

System Version	Release Information
System 7.0	integrated MultiFinder always enabled
System 7.0.1	introduced with LC II and Quadra series
System 7.0.1P	
System 7 Tuner	update for both 7.0 and 7.0.1
System 7.1	introduced the Fonts folder
System 7.1P	
System 7.1P1	
System 7.1P2	
System 7.1P3	last "P" release with new features
System 7.1P4	
System 7.1P5	
System 7.1P6	
System 7.1 Pro	version 7.1.1, combined with PowerTalk, Speech Manager, MacInTalk, Thread Manager
System 7.1.2	Macs equipped with a PowerPC processor
System 7.1.2P	only for Performa/LC/Quadra 630 series, very quickly replaced by 7.5
System 7.5	
System 7.5.1	System 7.5 Update 1.0—the first Macintosh operating system to display the "Mac OS" logo on the splash screen
System 7.5.2	Power Macs that use PCI, usable only on these Power Macs and PowerBooks 5300, 190, and Duo 2300
System 7.5.3	System 7.5 Update 2.0
System 7.5.3L	only for Macintosh clones
System 7.5.3 Revision 2	
System 7.5.3 Revision 2.1	only for Performa 6400/180 and 6400/200
System 7.5.4	withdrawn within hours of release and replaced by 7.5.5
System 7.5.5	last to support non-32-bit-clean Macs, including all with less than a 68030 CPU except the Macintosh LC

=== Early Mac OS ===
Mac OS 8 desktop

Apple had begun using the "Mac OS" branding publicly in 1995, starting with System 7.5.1's splash screen, and later on physical media packaging with Mac OS 7.6 in January of 1997. The company started straying away from the "System" branding in favor of "Mac OS" to distinguish their software from their actual hardware, accommodating Macintosh clones of that time. Planned internally as "Mac OS 7.7" and designed using elements from the scrapped "Copland" operating system, Apple, now under Steve Jobs' control again, would release the next major revision as Mac OS 8 in July of 1997. The name change was done in order to exploit a legal loophole, where Macintosh clones were legally cut off from using anything newer than System 7.x, subsequently shutting down the clone market.

Mac OS 7.6 through 9 had most 68k code replaced by modern code native to the PowerPC architecture. Features from the abandoned Copland project would be integrated into these versions. A multi-threaded Finder was included. The GUI was changed in appearance to a new shaded greyscale look named Platinum. This capability was provided by a new "appearance" API layer within the OS.

Apple sold over 1.2 million copies of Mac OS 8 in its first two weeks of availability and 3 million within six months, as part of a large grassroots movement among Mac users to upgrade. The movement revolved around "assisting" Apple through their financial struggles of the time period. Pirate groups even chipped in by refusing to illegally redistribute the OS.

Mac OS 8.1 in 1998 introduced an updated version of the Hierarchical File System named HFS+, which fixed many limitations of the earlier system and has been used in subsequent versions of macOS up until macOS High Sierra, when it was replaced with the Apple File System. There are some other interface changes such as separating network features from printing, and some improvements to application switching. In underlying technical design, however, the classic Mac OS family is not very different from System Software.

Mac OS 8.5 in October 1998 introduced the Sherlock search engine, and added several new search plug-ins.

Mac OS 8.6 in May 1999 provides much-improved memory implementation and management.

The next major revision of Mac OS, called Mac OS 9, was released on October 23, 1999. Mac OS 9 added improved support for AirPort wireless networking. It introduced an early implementation of multi-user support, although not fully integrating streamlined multi-user abilities. Other new features included its on-the-fly file encryption software with code signing and Keychain technologies, Remote Networking and File Server packages, and a much improved list of USB drivers.

Mac OS 9.1, released in early 2001, also makes the first use of the centralized Apple Software Update system setting to find and install OS and hardware updates.

Mac OS 9.2 in June 2001 also added some transitional technologies to help application developers adopt some Mac OS X features before the introduction of the new OS to the public. These included new APIs for the file system and the bundling of the Carbon library that apps could link to instead of the traditional API libraries. Other changes were made beginning with the Mac OS 9.2.1 update that would allow it to be launched within the Classic Environment of Mac OS X.

The final update to the Classic Mac OS family was version 9.2.2, released on December 5, 2001.

System Version	Release Information
Mac OS 7.6	Name formally and fully changed because of the experimental clone program, although System 7.5.1 and later used the "Mac OS" name on the splash screen.
Mac OS 7.6.1	Proper PowerPC error handling introduced.
Mac OS 8	First version to require a 68040 processor, dropping support for the remainder of the Macintosh II series and other 68030 Macs. Added support for PowerPC G3 processor.
Mac OS 8.1	Last version to support the 68k architecture. support for FireWire, and support for the Power Macintosh G3. Introduced HFS+.
Mac OS 8.5	First version to drop 68k support entirely, in favor of the PowerPC architecture. Added Sherlock, implemented new PowerPC QuickDraw/AppleScript speed upgrades, and added numerous UI updates.
Mac OS 8.5.1	Small stability and bug fixes
Mac OS 8.6	New nanokernel, Multiprocessing Services 2.0 support, improved PowerBook battery life, and added support for the PowerPC G4 processor
Mac OS 9	Initial retail version of Mac OS 9, added basic multi-user support and Keychain.
Mac OS 9.0.2 / 9.0.3	Hardware-specific releases included with early 2000s Powerbooks, iBooks, and Power Macintosh G4s. Mainly implemented small bug fixes and a certain QuickTime streaming problem.
Mac OS 9.0.4	First downloadable OS 9 update, fixed FireWire and USB stability.
Mac OS 9.1	Added Finder "Window" menu.
Mac OS 9.2	Pre-installed exclusively on Power Mac G4 Quicksilver desktops, improved speed and G4 support.
Mac OS 9.2.1	Free public update, improved performance and Classic Environment compatibility.
Mac OS 9.2.2	Final Classic Mac OS release, focused on stability and Mac OS X classic environment stability.

== Transition to Mac OS X ==
Logos/box-art of macOS from 10.0/10.1 to Tahoe 26

macOS is Apple's current Mac operating system that officially succeeded the Mac OS in 1999. Although it was originally marketed as simply "version 10" of Mac OS, it has a history that is largely independent of the earlier Mac OS releases.

The first version of Mac OS X, Mac OS X Server 1.0, retains the "Platinum" appearance from Mac OS and even resembles OPENSTEP. The first consumer version, Mac OS X 10.0 was the first version to arrive with the new Aqua user interface. Apple shortened the name to "OS X" in 2011 and then changed it to "macOS" in 2016 to align with the branding of Apple's other operating systems.

The macOS architectural legacy is the successor to (classic) Mac OS. It is a Unix-based operating system built on NeXTSTEP and technology developed at NeXT from the late 1980s. macOS also makes use of the BSD codebase and the XNU kernel, and its core set of components is based upon Apple's open source Darwin operating system.

Users of (classic) Mac OS generally upgraded to Mac OS X. Nonetheless, Mac OS X was criticized in its early years as more difficult and less user-friendly than classic Mac OS, for the lack of certain features that had not yet been reimplemented in the new OS, for being slower on the same hardware (especially older hardware), and for incompatibilities with the older OS. Because drivers (for printers, scanners, tablets, etc.) written for the older Mac OS were not compatible with Mac OS X, inconsistent program support with the Classic Environment program used to run the older operating system's programs on Mac OS X, and the lack of Mac OS X support for older Apple computers before late 1997; some Macintosh users continued using the older Mac OS for a few years after the original release of Mac OS X. Steve Jobs encouraged people to upgrade to Mac OS X by staging a mock funeral for Mac OS 9 at WWDC 2001.

=== Classic ===
PowerPC versions of Mac OS X include a compatibility layer for running older Mac applications. Originally codenamed the "blue box", the environment runs a nearly complete Mac OS operating system. This allows applications that have not been ported to the Carbon API to run on Mac OS X. This is reasonably seamless, though "classic" applications retain their original Mac OS appearance and do not gain the Mac OS X "Aqua" appearance.

Mac OS 9.2 had to be installed by the user—it was not installed by default on hardware revisions released after Mac OS X 10.4. Most well-written "classic" Mac OS applications function properly under this environment, but compatibility is assured only if the software was written to be unaware of the actual hardware and to interact solely with the operating system. The Classic Environment is not available on Intel-based Mac systems or the latest Apple silicon Macs.

== Emulation ==
=== 68k emulators ===
Third-party Macintosh emulators, such as vMac, Basilisk II, and Executor, eventually made it possible to run the Classic Mac OS on Intel-based PCs. These emulators were restricted to emulating the 68k series of processors, and as such most could not run versions of the Mac OS that succeeded 8, which required PowerPC processors. Most also required a Mac ROM image or a hardware interface supporting a real Mac ROM chip.

A notable exception was the Executor commercial software product from Abacus Research & Development, the only product that used 100% reverse-engineered code without the use of Apple technology. It ran extremely quickly but never achieved more than a minor subset of functionality. Few programs were completely compatible and many were extremely crash-prone if they ran at all. Executor filled a niche market for porting 68k Mac applications to x86 platforms; development ceased in 2002 and the source code was released by the author in late 2008. Emulators using Mac ROM images offered near complete Mac OS compatibility, and later versions offered excellent performance as modern x86 processor performance increased exponentially.

Apple included its own Mac 68k emulator that ran seamlessly on all PowerPC-based versions of the Classic Mac OS. Apple also sold a Mac 68k emulator for SPARC-based (Solaris) and PA-RISC based (HP-UX) systems called Macintosh Application Environment (MAE), which could run variants of System 7.x inside an X11 window.

=== PowerPC emulators ===
In comparison with 68k-emulator development, PowerPC emulation is more complex and requires more CPU power. The QEMU emulator is capable of running Mac OS and OS X at full speed with networking and sound in most cases. QEMU has official support for Mac OS and Mac OS X up to 10.5. QEMU has several advantages over other PowerPC emulators, such as supporting a wide range of platforms from Linux to Mac and Windows on current CPU architectures.

Another PowerPC emulator is SheepShaver, which has been around since 1998 for BeOS on the PowerPC platform, but in 2002 was open-sourced, and efforts began to port it to other platforms. Originally it was not designed for use on x86 platforms and required an actual PowerPC processor present in the machine it was running on similar to a hypervisor. Although it provides PowerPC processor support, it can run only up to Mac OS 9.0.4 because it does not emulate a memory management unit.

Other examples include ShapeShifter (by the same developer that created SheepShaver), Fusion, PearPC and iFusion. The latter ran Classic Mac OS with a PowerPC "coprocessor" accelerator card. Using this method has been said to equal or better the speed of a Macintosh with the same processor, especially with respect to the 68k series due to real Macs running in MMU trap mode, hampering performance.

Apple's initial version of Rosetta is a PowerPC emulator allowing Intel-based Macs to run PowerPC Mac OS X applications, but is unable to run non-Carbon Classic Mac OS (9.2.2 or earlier) applications. Rosetta was available for all Intel releases of OS X until version 10.7 Lion.

== Timeline ==
Timeline of Mac operating systems

== See also ==
- List of Apple operating systems
- Comparison of operating systems
- History of the graphical user interface
- Inside Macintosh
- Apple Computer, Inc. v. Microsoft Corp.
- List of Classic Mac OS software
