= Traut =

Traut is a surname. Notable people with the surname include:

- Bill Traut (1929–2014), American jazz musician, rock music producer, manager and record label executive
- Eric Traut, American software engineer and software emulation pioneer
- Hans Traut (1895–1974), German general
- Sascha Traut (born 1985), German footballer
- Walter Traut (1907–1979), Austrian film producer and production manager
