= Classic Mac OS memory management =

"About This Computer" Mac OS 9.1 window showing the memory consumption of each open application and the system software itself

Historically, the classic Mac OS used a form of memory management that has fallen out of favor in modern systems. Criticism of this approach was one of the key areas addressed by the change to Mac OS X.

The original problem for the engineers of the Macintosh was how to make optimum use of the 128 KB of RAM with which the machine was equipped, on Motorola 68000-based computer hardware that does not support virtual memory. Since at that time the machine could only run one application program at a time, and there was no fixed secondary storage, the engineers implemented a simple scheme that worked well with those particular constraints. That design choice did not scale well with the development of the machine, creating various difficulties for both programmers and users.

== Fragmentation ==
The primary concern of the original engineers appears to have been fragmentation – that is, the repeated allocation and deallocation of memory through pointers leading to many small isolated areas of memory which cannot be used because they are too small, even though the total free memory may be sufficient to satisfy a particular request for memory. To solve this, Apple engineers used the concept of a relocatable handle, a reference to memory which allowed the actual data referred to be moved without invalidating the handle. Apple's scheme was simple – a handle was simply a pointer into a (non-relocatable) table of further pointers, which in turn pointed to the data. If a memory request required compaction of memory, this was done and the table, called the master pointer block, was updated. The machine itself implemented two areas in memory available for this scheme – the system heap (used for the OS), and the application heap. As long as only one application at a time was run, the system worked well. Since the entire application heap was dissolved when the application quit, fragmentation was minimized.

The memory management system had weaknesses; the system heap was not protected from errant applications, as would have been possible if the system architecture had supported memory protection, and this was frequently the cause of system problems and crashes. In addition, the handle-based approach also opened up a source of programming errors, where pointers to data within such relocatable blocks could not be guaranteed to remain valid across calls that might cause memory to move. This was a real problem for almost every system API that existed. Because of the transparency of system-owned data structures at the time, the APIs could do little to solve this. Thus the onus was on the programmer not to create such pointers, or at least manage them very carefully by dereferencing all handles after every such API call. Since many programmers were not generally familiar with this approach, early Mac programs suffered frequently from faults arising from this.

Palm OS and 16-bit Windows use a similar scheme for memory management, but the Palm and Windows versions make programmer error more difficult. For instance, in Mac OS, to convert a handle to a pointer, a program just de-references the handle directly, but if the handle is not locked, the pointer can become invalid quickly. Calls to lock and unlock handles are not balanced; ten calls to HLock are undone by a single call to HUnlock. In Palm OS and Windows, handles are an opaque type and must be de-referenced with MemHandleLock on Palm OS or Global/LocalLock on Windows. When a Palm or Windows application is finished with a handle, it calls MemHandleUnlock or Global/LocalUnlock. Palm OS and Windows keep a lock count for blocks; after three calls to MemHandleLock, a block will only become unlocked after three calls to MemHandleUnlock.

Addressing the problem of nested locks and unlocks can be straightforward (although tedious) by employing various methods, but these intrude upon the readability of the associated code block and require awareness and discipline on the part of the coder.

== Memory leaks and stale references ==
Awareness and discipline are also necessary to avoid memory "leaks" (failure to deallocate within the scope of the allocation) and to avoid references to stale handles after release (which usually resulted in a hard crash—annoying on a single-tasking system, potentially disastrous if other programs are running).

== Switcher ==
The situation worsened with the advent of Switcher, which was a way for a Mac with 512 KB or more of memory to run multiple applications at once. This was a necessary step forward for users, who found the one-app-at-a-time approach very limiting. Because Apple was now committed to its memory management model, as well as compatibility with existing applications, it was forced to adopt a scheme where each application was allocated its own heap from the available RAM. The amount of actual RAM allocated to each heap was set by a value coded into the metadata of each application, set by the programmer. Sometimes this value wasn't enough for particular kinds of work, so the value setting had to be exposed to the user to allow them to tweak the heap size to suit their own requirements. While popular among "power users", this exposure of a technical implementation detail was against the grain of the Mac user philosophy. Apart from exposing users to esoteric technicalities, it was inefficient, since an application would be made to grab all of its allotted RAM, even if it left most of it subsequently unused. Another application might be memory starved, but would be unable to utilize the free memory "owned" by another application.

While an application could not beneficially utilize another application's heap, it could certainly destroy it, typically by inadvertently writing to a nonsense address. An application accidentally treating a fragment of text or image, or an unassigned location as a pointer could easily overwrite the code or data of other applications or even the OS, leaving "lurkers" even after the program was exited. Such problems could be extremely difficult to analyze and correct.

Switcher evolved into MultiFinder in System 4.2, which became the Process Manager in System 7, and by then the scheme was long entrenched. Apple made some attempts to work around the obvious limitations – temporary memory was one, where an application could "borrow" free RAM that lay outside of its heap for short periods, but this was unpopular with programmers so it largely failed to solve the problems. Apple's System 7 Tune-up addon added a "minimum" memory size and a "preferred" size—if the preferred amount of memory was not available, the program could launch in the minimum space, possibly with reduced functionality. This was incorporated into the standard OS starting with System 7.1, but still did not address the root problem.

Virtual memory schemes, which made more memory available by paging unused portions of memory to disk, were made available by third-party utilities like Connectix Virtual, and then by Apple in System 7. This increased Macintosh memory capacity at a performance cost, but did not add protected memory or prevent the memory manager's heap compaction that would invalidate some pointers.

== 32-bit clean ==
Originally the Macintosh had 128 KB of RAM, with a true limit of 4 MB, despite being soldered. This limit was first reached with the Macintosh Plus and its user upgradable memory. These first few Macintosh computers use the 68000 CPU, a 32-bit processor which has only 24 physical address lines. The 24 address lines allow the processor to address up to 16 MB of memory (2^{24} bytes), seen as sufficient at the time. The structure of the memory map divided this address space into maximums of 4 MB of RAM, 4 MB of ROM and the remaining 8 MB of addresses split between the SCC, IWM and VIA chips. This was fixed by changing the memory map with the Macintosh II, allowing up to 8 MB of RAM, by shrinking ROM and I/O addresses to 1 MB each and allocating the remaining 6 MB addresses to the NuBus slots. Connectix products MAXIMA, RAM Doubler, and Virtual allowed accessing and reallocating the 6 MB addresses for the NuBus cards for a total of 14 MB, minus 1 MB per slot occupied.

Because memory was a scarce resource, the authors of Classic Mac OS decided to take advantage of the unused byte in each address. The original Memory Manager (up until the advent of System 7) placed flags in the high 8 bits of each 32-bit pointer and handle. Each address contained flags such as "locked", "purgeable", or "resource", which were stored in the master pointer table. When used as an actual address, these flags were masked off and ignored by the CPU.

While a good use of very limited RAM space, this design caused problems when Apple introduced the Macintosh II, which used the 32-bit Motorola 68020 CPU. The 68020 had 32 physical address lines which could address up to 4 GB of memory. The flags that the Memory Manager stored in the high byte of each pointer and handle were significant now, and could lead to addressing errors.

On the Macintosh IIci and later machines, HLock() and other APIs were rewritten to implement handle locking in a way other than flagging the high bits of handles. But many Macintosh application programmers and a great deal of the Macintosh system software code itself accessed the flags directly rather than using the APIs, such as HLock(), which had been provided to manipulate them. By doing this they rendered their applications incompatible with true 32-bit addressing, and this became known as not being "32-bit clean".

In order to stop continual system crashes caused by this issue, System 6 and earlier running on a 68020 or a 68030 would force the machine into 24-bit mode, and would only recognize and address the first 8 megabytes of RAM, an obvious flaw in machines whose hardware was wired to accept up to 128 MB RAM – and whose product literature advertised this capability. With System 7, the Mac system software was finally made 32-bit clean, but there were still the problem of dirty ROMs. The problem was that the decision to use 24-bit or 32-bit addressing has to be made very early in the boot process, when the ROM routines initialized the Memory Manager to set up a basic Mac environment where NuBus ROMs and disk drivers are loaded and executed. Older ROMs did not have any 32-bit Memory Manager support and so was not possible to boot into 32-bit mode. Surprisingly, the first solution to this flaw was published by software utility company Connectix, whose System 6 extension, OPTIMA, reinitialized the Memory Manager and repeated early parts of the Mac boot process, allowing the system to boot into 32-bit mode and enabling the use of all the RAM in the machine. OPTIMA would later evolve into the more familiar 1991 product, MODE32, for System 7. Apple licensed the software from Connectix later in 1991 and distributed it for free. The Macintosh IIci and later Motorola based Macintosh computers had 32-bit clean ROMs.

It was quite a while before applications were updated to remove all 24-bit dependencies, and System 7 provided a way to switch back to 24-bit mode if application incompatibilities were found. By the time of migration to the PowerPC and System 7.1.2, 32-bit cleanliness was mandatory for creating native applications and even later Motorola 68040 based Macs could not support 24-bit mode.

== Object orientation ==
The rise of object-oriented languages for programming the Mac – first Object Pascal, then later C++ – also caused problems for the memory model adopted. At first, it would seem natural that objects would be implemented via handles, to gain the advantage of being relocatable. These languages, as they were originally designed, used pointers for objects, which would lead to fragmentation issues. A solution, implemented by the THINK (later Symantec) compilers, was to use Handles internally for objects, but use a pointer syntax to access them. This seemed a good idea at first, but soon deep problems emerged, since programmers could not tell whether they were dealing with a relocatable or fixed block, and so had no way to know whether to take on the task of locking objects or not. Needless to say this led to huge numbers of bugs and problems with these early object implementations. Later compilers did not attempt to do this, but used real pointers, often implementing their own memory allocation schemes to work around the Mac OS memory model.

While the Mac OS memory model, with all its inherent problems, remained this way right through to Mac OS 9, due to severe application compatibility constraints, the increasing availability of cheap RAM meant that by and large most users could upgrade their way out of a corner. The memory was not used efficiently, but it was abundant enough that the issue never became critical. This is ironic given that the purpose of the original design was to maximise the use of very limited amounts of memory. Mac OS X finally did away with the whole scheme, implementing a modern paged virtual memory scheme. A subset of the older memory model APIs still exists for compatibility as part of Carbon, but maps to the modern memory manager (a thread-safe malloc implementation) underneath. Apple recommends that Mac OS X code use malloc and free "almost exclusively".
