= Sony Computer Entertainment, Inc. v. Connectix Corp. =

United States intellectual property law case

Sony Computer Entertainment v. Connectix Corporation
- Court: United States Court of Appeals for the Ninth Circuit
- Full case name: Sony Computer Entertainment v. Connectix Corporation
- Argued: Sept. 14, 1999
- Decided: February 10, 2000
- Verdict: The development of an emulator does not inherently constitute copyright infringement.
- Citation: 203 F.3d 596 (9th Cir. 2000)

Case history
- Prior history: Injunction granted, 48 F. Supp. 2d 1212 (N.D. Cal. 1999)
- Subsequent history: cert. denied, 531 U.S. 871 (2000)

Court membership
- Judges sitting: Herbert Choy, William Canby Jr., and Barry G. Silverman

Sony Computer Entertainment v. Connectix Corporation, 203 F.3d 596 (2000), commonly referred to as simply Sony v. Connectix, is a decision by the Ninth Circuit Court of Appeals which ruled that the copying of a copyrighted BIOS software during the development of an emulator software does not constitute copyright infringement, but is covered by fair use. The court also ruled that Sony's PlayStation trademark had not been tarnished by Connectix Corp.'s sale of its emulator software, the Virtual Game Station.

== Background of the case ==
In July 1998, Connectix started the development of the Virtual Game Station (VGS) as a Macintosh software application that emulates Sony's popular PlayStation video games console's hardware and firmware. This would make it possible for VGS users to play games developed for the PlayStation on Macintosh hardware, with plans to release a Windows PC compatible version at a later date. Connectix's development strategy was based upon reverse engineering the PlayStation's BIOS firmware, first by using the unchanged BIOS to develop emulation for the hardware, and then by developing a BIOS of their own using the original firmware as an aid for debugging. During the development work, Connectix contacted Sony, requesting "technical assistance" for completing the VGS, but this request was eventually declined in September 1998.

The Virtual Game Station development reached completion in December 1998, with the software being commercially released in the following month, January 1999. Sony perceived the VGS as a threat to its video game business, and filed a complaint alleging copyright infringement as well as violations of intellectual property against Connectix on January 27, 1999. Sony drew support from fellow video game hardware manufacturers Nintendo, Sega, and 3dfx Interactive, while Connectix was backed by fellow software firms and trade associations.

The district court awarded Sony an injunction blocking Connectix

1. from copying or using the Sony BIOS code in the development of the Virtual Game Station for Windows; and
2. from selling the Virtual Game Station for Macintosh or the Virtual Game Station for Windows.

The district court also impounded all of Connectix's copies of the Sony BIOS and all copies of works based upon or incorporating Sony BIOS. Connectix then successfully appealed the ruling, with the United States Courts of Appeals for the Ninth Circuit reversing the earlier decision.

== The court's decision ==
The Ninth Circuit Court's 3-0 ruling centered on deciding whether or not Connectix's copying of the PlayStation firmware while reverse engineering it had been protected by fair use. The court relied heavily on the similar case between Sega Enterprises Ltd. v. Accolade Inc. in 1992, where the key finding relating to Connectix v. Sony was that copying for the purpose of reverse engineering was within fair use.

Each of the four components of fair use were considered by the court individually. The components are the nature of the copyrighted work, the amount and substantiality of the portion used, the purpose and character of the use and the effect of the use on the potential market.

=== 1. Nature of the copyrighted work ===
While the Ninth District Court did acknowledge that software code does deserve copyright protection, the court, following the precedent of Sega v. Accolade, deemed that the PlayStation firmware fell under a lowered degree of copyright protection because it contained unprotected parts (functional elements) that could not be examined without copying. The court also rejected the semantic distinction between "studying" and "use" made by the district court, finding it to be artificial. The court case states, "[T]hey disassembled Sony's code not just to study the concepts. They actually used that code in the development of [their] product."

=== 2. Amount and substantiality of the portion used ===
The court saw this criterion as being of little significance to the case at hand. While Connectix did disassemble and copy the Sony BIOS repeatedly over the course of reverse engineering, the final product of the Virtual Game Station contained no infringing material. As a result, "this factor [held] ... very little weight." in determining the decision.

=== 3. Purpose and character of the use ===
Sony had argued that Connectix infringed Sony's copyright by making numerous intermediate copies (that is, copies of copyrighted computer code created to aid the development of a non-infringing product) of the PlayStation BIOS during the reverse engineering process. The court rejected this notion, ruling that such a copy-grounded basis for what qualified as fair use would result in software engineers choosing inefficient engineering methods that minimized the number of intermediate copies. Preventing such "wasted effort", they argued, was the very purpose of fair use.

In addition, the court found that the ultimate purpose and character of Connectix's use of Sony's BIOS - in that it created a new platform for Sony PlayStation games - qualified as "modestly transformative." This factor of fair use, therefore, lay in Connectix's favor.

=== 4. Effect of the use upon the potential market ===
The court held in favor of Connectix on this point as well. While the Virtual Game Station might very well lower Sony's PlayStation console sales, its transformative status- allowing PlayStation games to be played on Mac - rendered it a legitimate competitor in the market for Sony and Sony-licensed games: "For this reason, some economic loss by Sony as a result of this competition does not compel a finding of no fair use. Sony understandably seeks control over the market for devices that play games Sony produces or licenses. The copyright law, however, does not confer such a monopoly."

The Ninth Circuit Court also reversed the district court's ruling that the Virtual Game Station tarnished Sony's "PlayStation" trademark. Sony had to show that (1) the PlayStation "mark is famous"; (2) Connectix is "making commercial use of the mark"; (3) Connectix's "use began after the mark became famous"; and that (4) Connectix's "use of the mark dilutes the quality of the mark by diminishing the capacity of the mark to identify and distinguish goods and services." As the first three points were not under debate (Connectix conceded points (1) and (3) ), the court addressed only the fourth point.

The court also took the opinion that the provided studies were lacking sufficient evidence of diluting the PlayStation trademark: "The evidence here fails to show or suggest that Sony's mark or product was regarded or was likely to be regarded negatively because of its performance on Connectix's Virtual Game Station. The evidence is not even substantial on the quality of that performance. … Sony's tarnishment claim cannot support the injunction."

== Conclusion and aftermath ==
The Ninth Circuit Court reversed the district court's decision both on the copyright infringement and the trademark tarnishing claims, lifting the injunction against Connectix. Connectix immediately filed a motion with the district court to summarily dismiss Sony's lawsuit. After a failed attempt by Sony to appeal the case to the Supreme Court, the two companies settled out of court about a year later. On March 15, 2001, Sony purchased the VGS rights from Connectix. They discontinued the product June 30 of that year. Connectix itself closed in August 2003.

Video game emulation advocates have asserted that Sony vs. Connectix established the legality of emulators within the United States.

== See also ==
- Sega v. Accolade
- Connectix
- Video game console emulator
- Nintendo of America Inc. v. Tropic Haze LLC
