= QuickCam =

Line of webcam products by Logitech

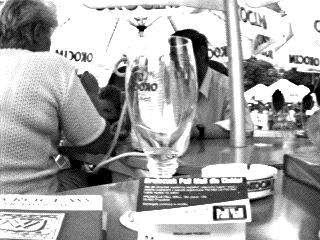
A picture taken with the original Connectix QuickCam.

QuickCam is a line of webcam video camera products originally produced by Connectix in 1994 and acquired by Logitech in 1998. Although its picture quality would today be considered primitive, it was the first widespread used webcam-like device.

== History ==
The original QuickCam was developed by Connectix in 1994 for US-wide commercial sale and was the first widely marketed webcam-like device, although its original advertising did not use the term "webcam" or refer to the World Wide Web, then in its infancy. Video conferencing via computers already existed at the time, and client-server based video conferencing software such as CU-SeeMe was gaining popularity. Eventually, it evolved from an RS-422 connector to a parallel connector then eventually to a USB connection.

The initial model was available only for the Apple Macintosh, connecting to it via the serial port. It produced 16 shades of gray at a resolution of 320×240 pixels, and could record video at about 15 frames per second; it cost $100.

The software that originally shipped with the camera included QuickMovie for recording motion pictures and QuickPICT for capturing still images.

The QuickCam product line was acquired by Logitech in August 1998. The company has gradually decreased support for the Macintosh platform, with only one model as of 2010 officially supporting Mac or including Mac drivers. This could largely be the result of Apple building webcams into their laptop and desktop computers, negating the need for external third party devices. Many recent models implement the USB video device class standard and work under Mac OS without additional drivers.

In October 2010, QuickCam was elected to Time Magazine's Top 100 Gadgets of all Time.

== Cameras ==
This list is non-exhaustive.

Camera	Model #	Part #	Image	Year	Category	Sensor resolution	Focus	RRP (USD)	Notes
Connectix QuickCam				1994	General	320 × 240 4bpp Greyscale		$100	Sold over 500,000 units from 1994 to 1997. Serial model with built-in microphone and Parallel model.
Connectix Color QuickCam				1996	General	320 × 240 24bpp		$199	Serial model with built-in microphone and Parallel model.
Connectix Color QuickCam 2				1997	General	320 × 240 24bpp		$199	Improved sensor and optical system, optimised for indoor use Parallel model only.
Connectix QuickCam VC				1998	General	320 × 240		$99 – $129	VC for "Video Conferencing". First USB QuickCam; also supports parallel ports.
Connectix QuickCam Home				1998	General	320 × 240		$130	Only USB.
Connectix QuickCam Pro				1998	High-End	640 × 480		$150	USB and Parallel.
Logitech USB QuickCam Home				1998	General	352x288			
Logitech QuickCam Express				1999	General	320 × 240 @ 30 frame/s, 640 × 480 @ 15 frame/s		$49	.
Logitech QuickCam Web				1999	High-End	640 × 480 @ 30 frame/s			Only USB. With built-in microphone.
Logitech QuickCam Pro 3000				2000	High-End	640 × 480			
Logitech QuickCam 3000				2001	Business	640 × 480			
Logitech QuickCam Traveler				2001	Notebook	640 × 480 @ 30 frame/s		$99 – $149	First "laptop" QuickCam.
Logitech QuickCam for Notebooks		961404-0403		2001	Notebook	640 × 480 video, 640 × 480 still photo	Manual		
Logitech QuickCam for Notebooks Pro		961398-0403		2001	Notebook	1.3 Mpixel resolution			RealLight lighting correction. f=3.85 mm
Logitech QuickCam Pro 4000				2002	High-End	640 × 480 @ 15 frame/s			Can take interpolated 1280 × 960 stills.
Logitech QuickCam Zoom				2002	General	640 × 480		$99	Features a digital zoom that focuses on the user's face. Re-released as "QuickCam Zoom Silver" in 2003, then "QuickCam Zoom Refresh" in 2004.
Logitech QuickCam Sphere				2003	Flagship	640 × 480			First motorised pan/tilt QuickCam. Known as "QuickCam Orbit" in North America
Logitech QuickCam Messenger				2004	General				
Logitech QuickCam Express 2				2004	General				
Logitech QuickCam Communicate MP		997-000078 960-000240		2004	General	960 × 720 video, 4.0 Mpixel still photo	Fixed		183 cm USB cord. Adjusts lighting in dim light.
Logitech QuickCam Cordless				2004	Speciality				
Logitech QuickCam for Notebooks Deluxe	V-UBU49	860-000070 960-000095		2005	Notebook	640 × 480 video, 1.3 Mpixel still photo	Manual		78 cm USB cord
Logitech QuickCam Chat				2005	General		Manual		
Logitech QuickCam Fusion				2005	General				
Logitech QuickCam Pro 5000				2005	High-End				
Logitech QuickCam Sphere MP				2005	Flagship	640 × 480			Motorized pan/tilt. Known as the "QuickCam Orbit MP" in North America
Logitech QuickCam Ultra Vision				2005	High-End	640 × 480 @ 30 frame/s			
Logitech QuickCam Connect				2006	General	640 × 480 video, 640 × 480 still photo			
Logitech QuickCam Communicate STX	V-UBK45 V-UAM14A	961410-0403 961443-0403 961464-0403 961687-0403		2006	General	640 × 480 @ 30 frame/s, 1.3 Mpixel still photo	Fixed		
Logitech 720p Webcam C905	V-UBU48	860-000108		2007	Notebook/General	1600 × 1200 video, 8.0 Mpixel still photo	Auto		78 cm USB cord. Comes with 30 weighted base and mounting stalk. RightLight2 lighting correction.
Logitech QuickCam Pro 9000	V-UBM46	860-000109 960-000313		2007	High-End	1600 × 1200 @ 30 frame/s video, 8.0 Mpixel still photo	Auto		210 cm cord
Logitech QuickCam IM				2007	General	640 × 480			
Logitech QuickCam Sphere AF				2007	Flagship	1600 × 1200			Known as "QuickCam Orbit AF" in North America.
Logitech QuickCam Vision Pro		960-000254		2008	Macintosh	1600 × 1200	Auto		

== See also ==
- History of videotelephony
- List of video telecommunication services and product brands
- Videoconferencing
