= Dennis Karjala =

American law professor (1939–2017)

Dennis S. Karjala (December 19, 1939 – April 26, 2017) was an American intellectual property law professor at Arizona State University. His major interests in teaching and research were primarily in the area of intellectual property, specifically in copyright and its applications in digital technologies. His work in the field of intellectual property was internationally recognized and complemented by his ease in speaking and writing in Japanese.

Karjala, who began working at Arizona State University in 1978, taught international copyright and intellectual property in cyberspace. However, for a long time he worked and wrote articles in the areas of security, corporate rights, federal (personal and corporate) taxation and business planning.

He was a visiting professor at numerous universities including the University of Minnesota and UCLA leading classes in the areas of security and copyright. He also worked as a lawyer early in his career at McCutchen, Doyle, Brown & Enersen in California.

== Karjala on copyright ==
Karjala has been very involved with causes related to the laws of copyright and is cited in several cases related to this subject.

In 1992, he was involved with the Sega v. Accolade case, in which Sega was suing Accolade with allegations of infringement of copyrights, trademarks, and unfair competition.

=== Copyright extension ===
Karjala has written and testified regarding copyright term extension, first with the 1998 Copyright Term Extension Act (CTEA). He testified in front of the Judiciary Committee, arguing that the proposal would generate great costs to the general public without bringing any benefit. In addition, Karjala also wrote several letters directed to members of Congress, arguing that the proposed extension would not benefit the public. However, despite these efforts, the law was passed.

Karjala owns a website called "Opposing Copyright Extension" where he talks about the CTEA, expresses his opinion on the subject and disseminates materials on the law and copyright terms policies. On the website itself, he mentions that it was created in the hope that when this topic comes up again, those who seek to defend the public interest have more ammunition for it. Karjala also thanks Harvard University professor Lawrence Lessig for his dedicated efforts. According to Karjala, Lessig provided an immeasurable amount of his time, money and talent in favor of the cause and that, no matter how they did not succeed, the struggle was important to present the problem to the public.

In 2013, Karjala was quoted in The Washington Post in a story about the extension of copyright, discussing the CTEA, and the possible extension of extension of the copyrights protection of several classics, including Mickey Mouse and even Superman, for another 20 years. Referring to the CTEA, Karjala said that "there was not a single argument that could be maintained after any kind of reasonable analysis." In another citation of the article, he mentions that the people who support the law are precisely those who would benefit directly if it were approved, i.e., copyrights of old works that were about to expire.

In 2015, the Los Angeles Times reviewed the copyright problems with The Diary of Anne Frank, which is still under copyright. Karjala, quoted, said there is nothing that would make a 95-year copyright term an incentive for anyone to create anything and that the law is not meant to influence artistic expression.

== Personal life ==
He was married to Katarina Karjala and had three children. Karjala was fluent in Japanese, and also familiar with German, French and Slovak.

== Education ==
Before entering the field of intellectual property, Karjala studied electrical engineering.

- 1961 - Princeton University, Electrical Engineering / Physics, B.S.E. Cum laude
- 1963 - University of Illinois, Electrical Engineering, M.S.
- 1965 - University of Illinois, Electrical Engineering, Ph.D.
- 1972 - University of California at Berkeley, Law, J.D., Order of the Coif

== Career ==
He had worked in several universities as a visiting professor and often takes sabbatical years to devote himself to his research. It follows a little of his career over the years:

- 1966–1969: Assistant Professor of Electrical Engineering at Michigan State University, teaching courses in the field of electromagnetic field theory.
- 1972–1977: He worked as a lawyer at McCutchen, Doyle, Brown & Enersen in San Francisco, California, engaged in business and corporate practice involving companies of all sizes.
- 1977: Independent researcher at the Center for Interdisciplinary Research at the University of Bielefeld in Germany, in a project that investigated the historical development of big business in England, France, Germany and the United States.
- 1978: He worked as an instructor in writing and legal analysis at New Mexico University and entered Arizona State University as an associate professor.
- 1980–1981: He was a lecturer at the Faculty of Law of Hokkaido University in Japan.
- 1981: Became a law professor at Arizona State University, where he works until today.
- 1984: Visiting professor at UCLA Law School, teaching courses in tax and safety areas.
- 1985–1986: Tokyo University, sabbatical year. Karjala conducted research on computer law, particularly Japanese software law.
- 1987: He returned to University of Tokyo during the summer as a visiting researcher.
- 1988: Visiting professor at Washington University, where he offered a basic course on corporations and a seminar on computers and the law.
- 1990: Visiting professor at Tokyo University, conducting classes on advanced topics of security laws.
- 1992–1993: Sabbatical year as a researcher at the Max Planck Institute in Munich, studying in the area of copyright protection of computer software.
- 1997–1998: Visiting professor at the University of Minnesota Law School, teaching courses in the areas of copyright, business associations, and security laws.
- 2001–2002: Sabbatical year in Canada as a visiting researcher at the Faculty of Law of the University of British Columbia.
- 2008–2009: Sabbatical year in Bratislava, teaching courses on the United States and international intellectual property at the Law School of Comenius University.

== Publications ==
Karjala had an extensive list of scholarly articles on his curriculum. In addition, he has published some books, including some in Japanese.

=== Books ===
- "Human Genome Initiative" (Center for the Study of Law, Science and Technology, Arizona State University 1992).
- Seminar on American Securities Law (Sho¯ji Ho'mu Kenkyu¯kai 1991).
- Dennis S. Karjala & K. Sugiyama, "Japan U.S. Computer Copyright Law" (Nihon Hyo, Inc., 1989).
- "Cases and Materials for Computers and the Law" (Arizona State University College of Law 1984).

=== Contribution to books ===
- Intellectual Property Management in Health and Agricultural Innovation: A Handbook of Best Practices (ISBN 1424320267, MIHR-USA, 2007).
- "Functionality as the Distinction Between Patent and Copyright Subject Matter" (227 Lorrie Cranor & Steven Wildman eds., MIT Press 2003).
- "Federal Tax Aspects of Separation and Divorce" (3d ed Michie 1998).
- The Term of Copyright in Growing Pains: Adapting Copyright to Libraries, Education and Society Laura N. Gasaway ed., Fred B. Rothman & Company 1997.
- "The Future of Copyright in the Digital Age" (H. Herrmann ed., Walter de Gruyter 1996).
- Recent Developments in the Copyright Protection of Computer Software in the United States and Japan, 909, (H.G. Leser & T. Isomura, eds., Duncker & Humblot 1992).
- Intellectual Property Rights in Japan and the Protection of Computer Software (F. W. Rushing & C. G. Brown eds., Westview Press 1990).
- Federal Tax Aspects of Separation and Divorce (Michie 1986).
- The board of directors in English and American Companies through 1920 (N. Horn & J. Kocka eds., Vandenhoeck und Ruprecht 1979).

=== Recent articles ===
- "Sustainability and Intellectual Property Rights in Traditional Knowledge," 53 Jurimetrics J. 57 (2012).
- "Intellectual Property Rights Within the University: The Lithuanian and U.S. Examples", Dennis Karjala & Mindaugas Kiskis, 1 Intellectual Economics 65 (2011).
- "Protecting Innovation in Computer Software, Biotechnology and Nanotechnology", 16 Va. J. L. Tech. 42 (2011).
- "Access to Computer Programs Under the DMCA", 25 J. Marshall J. of Comp. & Info. Law 641 (2009).
- "Copyright and Creativity", 15 U.C.L.A. Ent. L. Rev 169 (2008).
- "Judicial Oversight of Copyright Legislation", 35 N. Ky. L. Rev. 253 (2008).
- "Does Information Beget Information?", 2007 Duke Law & Tech. Rev. 1 (2007).
- "Biotech Patents and Indigenous Peoples", 7 Minn. J. L. Sci. & Tech. 483 (2006).
- "Congestion Externalities as a Basis for Extended Intellectual Property Protection", 94 Geo. L. J. 1065 (2006).
- Harry Potter, Tanya Grotter, and the Copyright Derivative Work, 38 Ariz. St. L. J. 17 (2006).
- "Distinguishing Patent and Copyright Subject Matter", 35 Conn. L. Rev. 439 (2003).
- "Looking Beyond Intellectual Property in Resolving Protection of Intangible Cultural Heritage of Indigenous Peoples," Robert K. Paterson & Dennis S. Karjala, 11 Cardozo J. Int'l & Comp. L. 633 (2003).
- "Judicial Review of Copyright Term Extension Legislation", 36 Loy. L.A. L. Rev. 199 (2002).
- "Digital Copyright", 42 Jurimetrics J. 97 (2001).
