= Hardware architecture =

An orthographically projected diagram of the F-117A Nighthawk

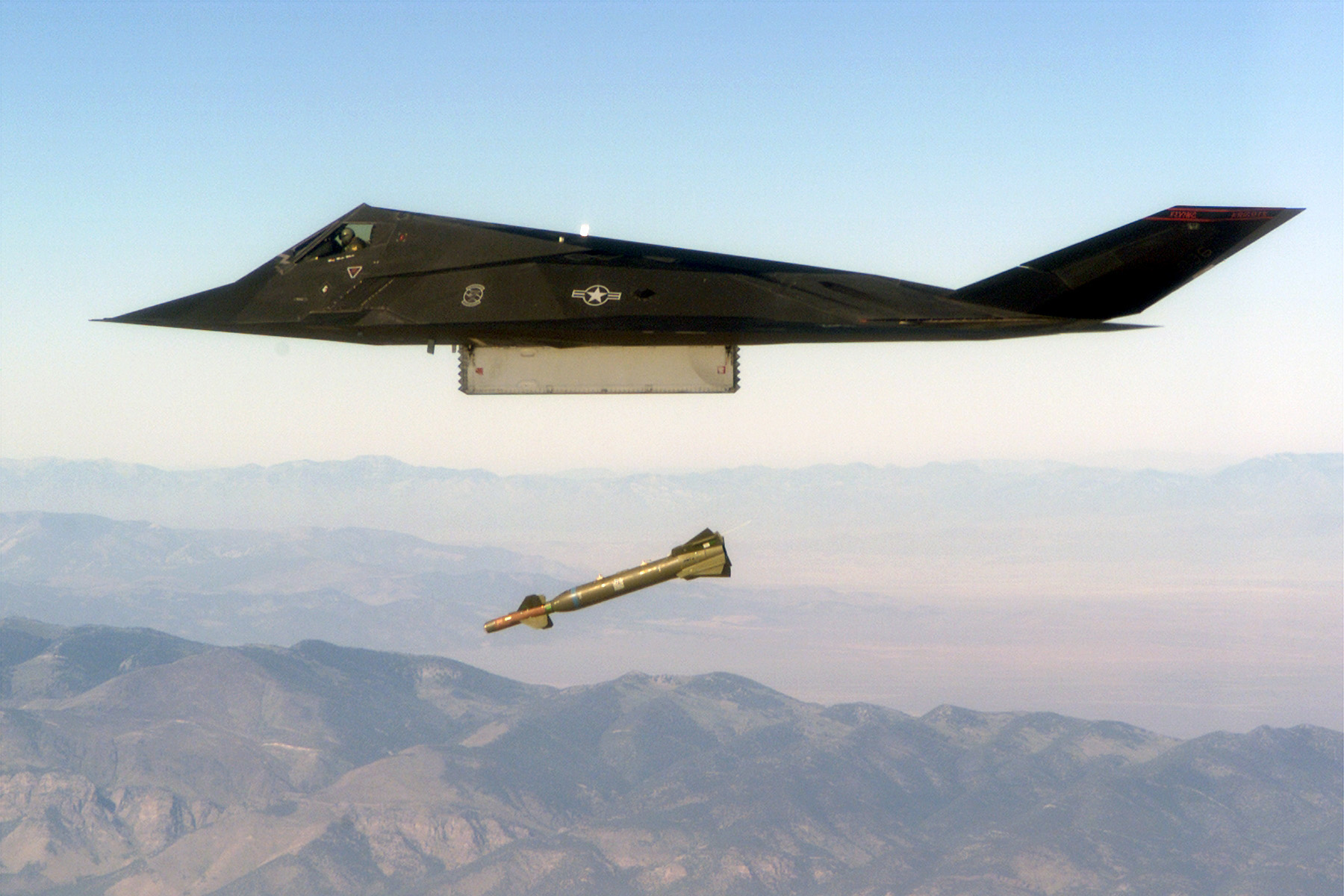
An F-117 conducts a live exercise bombing run using GBU-27 laser-guided bombs.

In engineering, hardware architecture refers to the identification of a system's physical components and their interrelationships. This description, often called a hardware design model, allows hardware designers to understand how their components fit into a system architecture and provides to software component designers important information needed for software development and integration. Clear definition of a hardware architecture allows the various traditional engineering disciplines (e.g., electrical and mechanical engineering) to work more effectively together to develop and manufacture new machines, devices and components.

Hardware is also an expression used within the computer engineering industry to explicitly distinguish the (electronic computer) hardware from the software that runs on it. But hardware, within the automation and software engineering disciplines, need not simply be a computer of some sort. A modern automobile runs vastly more software than the Apollo spacecraft. Also, modern aircraft cannot function without running tens of millions of computer instructions embedded and distributed throughout the aircraft and resident in both standard computer hardware and in specialized hardware components such as IC wired logic gates, analog and hybrid devices, and other digital components. The need to effectively model how separate physical components combine to form complex systems is important over a wide range of applications, including computers, personal digital assistants (PDAs), cell phones, surgical instrumentation, satellites, and submarines.

Hardware architecture is the representation of an engineered (or to be engineered) electronic or electromechanical hardware system, and the process and discipline for effectively implementing the design(s) for such a system. It is generally part of a larger integrated system encompassing information, software, and device prototyping.

It is a representation because it is used to convey information about the related elements comprising a hardware system, the relationships among those elements, and the rules governing those relationships.

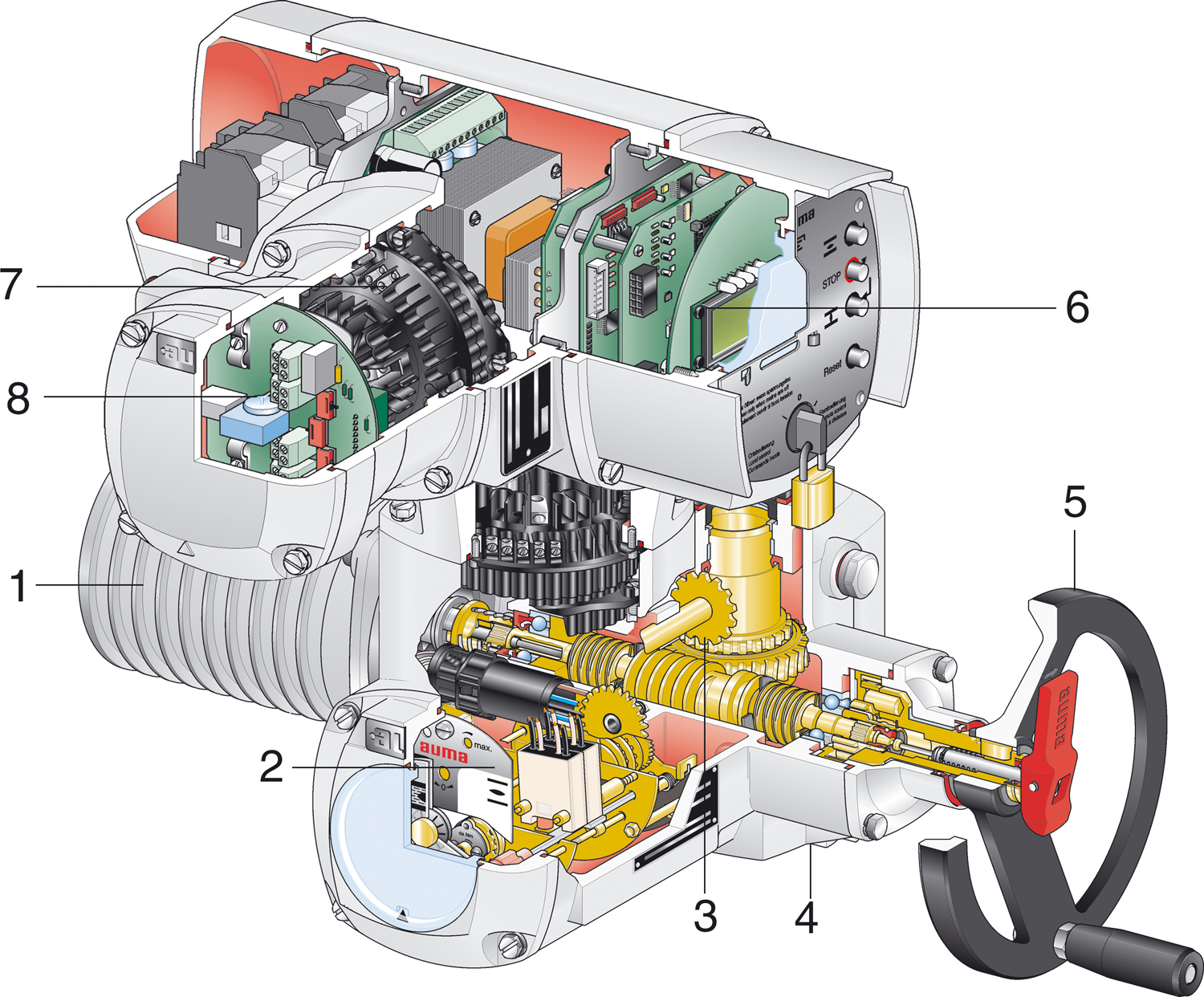
Electric multi-turn valve actuator with controls

It is a process because a sequence of steps is prescribed to produce or change the architecture, and/or a design from that architecture, of a hardware system within a set of constraints.

It is a discipline because a body of knowledge is used to inform practitioners as to the most effective way to design the system within a set of constraints.

A hardware architecture is primarily concerned with the internal electrical (and, more rarely, the mechanical) interfaces among the system's components or subsystems, and the interface between the system and its external environment, especially the devices operated by or the electronic displays viewed by a user. (This latter, special interface, is known as the computer human interface, AKA human computer interface, or HCI; formerly called the man-machine interface.) Integrated circuit (IC) designers are driving current technologies into innovative approaches for new products. Hence, multiple layers of active devices are being proposed as single chip, opening up opportunities for disruptive microelectronic, optoelectronic, and new microelectromechanical hardware implementation.

== Background ==
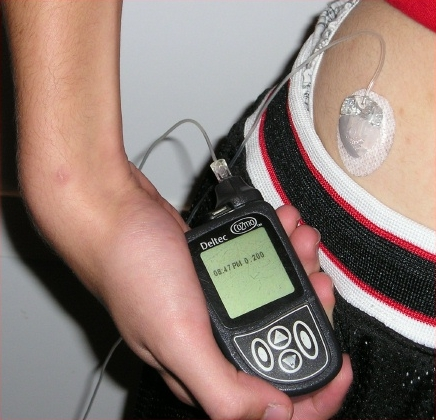
A hardware architecture example, which is integrated as a handheld medical device for diabetes monitoring

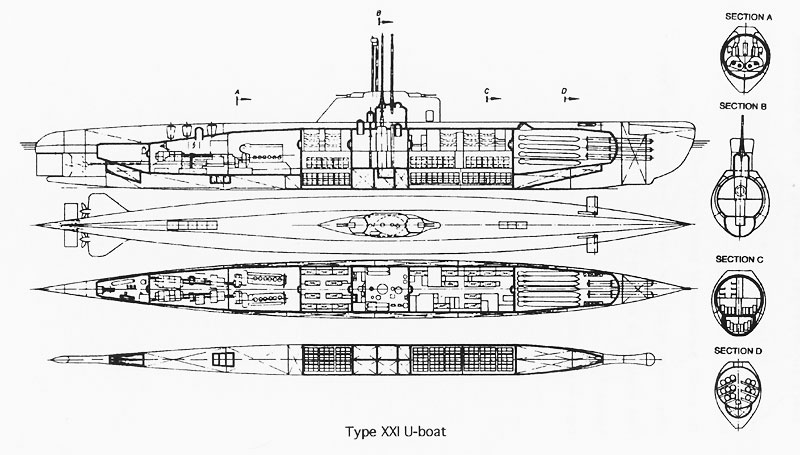
U-boat layout, with detailed equipment hardware specification and functionality

Prior to the advent of digital computers, the electronics and other engineering disciplines used the terms system and hardware as they are still commonly used today. However, with the arrival of digital computers on the scene and the development of software engineering as a separate discipline, it was often necessary to distinguish among engineered hardware artifacts, software artifacts, and the combined artifacts.

A programmable hardware artifact, or machine, that lacks its computer program is impotent; even as a software artifact, or program, is equally impotent unless it can be used to alter the sequential states of a suitable (hardware) machine. However, a hardware machine and its programming can be designed to perform an almost illimitable number of abstract and physical tasks. Within the computer and software engineering disciplines (and, often, other engineering disciplines, such as communications), then, the terms hardware, software, and system came to distinguish between the hardware that runs a computer program, the software, and the hardware device complete with its program.

A hardware can be controlled from a software with the help of a middle device called hardware controller, this hardware controller can be used to perform various automated task from hardware, generally hardware controller consist of GPIO(general purpose input and output) pins, these pin's behaviour controlled by the piece of code.

The hardware engineer or architect deals (more or less) exclusively with the hardware device; the software engineer or architect deals (more or less) exclusively with the program; and the systems engineer or systems architect is responsible for seeing that the programming is capable of properly running within the hardware device, and that the system composed of the two entities is capable of properly interacting with its external environment, especially the user, and performing its intended function.

A hardware architecture, then, is an abstract representation of an electronic or an electromechanical device capable of running a fixed or changeable program.

A hardware architecture generally includes some form of analog, digital, or hybrid electronic computer, along with electronic and mechanical sensors and actuators. Hardware design may be viewed as a 'partitioning scheme,' or algorithm, which considers all of the system's present and foreseeable requirements and arranges the necessary hardware components into a workable set of cleanly bounded subsystems with no more parts than are required. That is, it is a partitioning scheme that is exclusive, inclusive, and exhaustive. A major purpose of the partitioning is to arrange the elements in the hardware subsystems so that there is a minimum of electrical connections and electronic communications needed among them. In both software and hardware, a good subsystem tends to be seen as a meaningful "object." Moreover, a clear allocation of user requirements to the architecture (hardware and software) provides an effective basis for validation tests of the user's requirements in the as-built system.

== See also ==
- Computer-aided manufacturing (CAM)
- Electronic design automation (EDA)
- Elmer FEM solver
- Finite element analysis
- Hardware architect
- Integrated circuit (IC)
- System-on-a-chip (SoC)
- Very-large-scale integration (VLSI)
- VHSIC Hardware Description Language (VHDL)
- Technology CAD (TCAD)
- Open Cascade Technology
- ASIC
- Open source hardware
