= Big Mac (computer) =

Cancelled prototype Macintosh workstation

- Final design for the Big Mac
- Also known as: BigMac, Super Mac
- Developer: Apple Computer, Inc.
- Product family: Compact Macintosh
- Type: All-in-one
- Operating system: UNIX
- CPU: Motorola 68020 @ 16 MHz
- Storage: 10 MB HDD
- Display: 15 in (38 cm)
- Predecessor: Apple Lisa
- Successor: Macintosh Plus; Macintosh II

Baby Mac
- Final design for the Baby Mac
- Also known as: BabyMac, Macintosh
- Developer: Apple Computer, Inc.
- Product family: Compact Macintosh
- Type: All-in-one
- Released: Intended for 1986; ultimately cancelled
- Display: 11.25 in (28.6 cm) (Note: Calculated by assuming Big Mac and Baby Mac displays are the same width)
- Predecessor: Macintosh 128K; Macintosh 512K
- Successor: Macintosh 512Ke; Macintosh SE

Big Mac (also written BigMac and labeled Super Mac on prototypes) is a cancelled workstation designed by Hartmut Esslinger for Apple Computer using the Snow White design language. Its consumer equivalent was Baby Mac (also written BabyMac and simply labeled Macintosh on prototypes). Development on Big Mac and Baby Mac began in 1984 and stopped after Steve Jobs left the company due to a clash of ideologies with John Sculley. Without the knowledge of Jobs, a project codenamed "Milwaukee" was in development concurrently with the Big Mac and ultimately succeeded it to become the Macintosh II, causing designer Rich Page to leave Apple for NeXT. Esslinger described Baby Mac as his "best design never to be produced", while Jean-Louis Gassée considered it to be a toy.

== Hardware ==
Esslinger and the design team investigated flat-screen displays and worked with Toshiba to create a new CRT front to "avoid the cheap look of a CRT screen". Esslinger created low-profile mouse, keyboard, and mouse pen designs, experimenting with wireless RF technology to make the Baby Mac even smaller and "avoid the tangled mess of keyboard and mouse cables". Big Mac and Baby Mac were zero-draft designs and included integrated carrying handles.

Big Mac was conceived as a 3M computer, with at least 1 megabyte of memory, a 1 megapixel display, and 1 million instructions per second. Similarly to the later Macintosh Portrait Display and the earlier Xerox Alto display, its 15 in (38 cm) display had a vertical orientation for word processing and was monochrome to save on costs. To develop MacPaint 2.0, David Ramsey used a prototype Big Mac without an external case, which he considered "faster and more reliable than the Macintosh II prototypes available".

The design of the Baby Mac has been noted to have a superficial resemblance to the egg design of the iMac G3 from 1998.

== Software ==
Big Mac was intended to have a UNIX-based operating system while maintaining compatibility with existing Macintosh software and using the same user interface.
