= Ishido: The Way of Stones =

1990 video game

- Developer: Publishing International
- Publisher: Accolade
- Producer: Brad Fregger
- Designer: Michael Feinberg
- Programmers: Ian Gilman; Mike Sandige
- Composers: Ed Bogas (FM Towns); Masaharu Iwata (Famicom)
- Platforms: Classic Mac OS, MS-DOS, Genesis, Lynx, Game Boy, Amiga, Famicom Disk System, FM Towns, MSX2, PC-88, PC-98, X68000
- Release: 1990
- Genre: Puzzle
- Mode: Single-player

Ishido: The Way of Stones is a 1990 puzzle video game developed by Publishing International and published by Accolade. It was designed by Michael Feinberg and programmed by Ian Gilman and Michael Sandige. The game's producer was Brad Fregger, and Brodie Lockard (the designer of the Shanghai video game) contributed with graphics.

== Gameplay ==
Ishido is a puzzle board game consisting of a set of 72 stones and a game board of 96 squares.

Every stone has two attributes: a color and a symbol. There are six colors and six symbols in each stone set, thus creating 36 unique stones. Since each stone comes in a pair, there are therefore 72 stones in each stone set.

The primary objective of Ishido is to place all 72 stones onto the board of 96 squares. The challenge arises because stones must be placed adjacent to others that they match, either by color or symbol. When the board begins to fill up, this objective is not so easily accomplished.

A valuable move is the 4-way, in which a stone is placed in the midst of four others, two of which are matched by color, and two which are matched by symbol.

Ishido comes with six differently themed stone sets, five different game boards, and a variety of Oriental chimes and sound effects.

=== Oracle and legend ===
Integrated into Ishido is an oracle, a way to ask questions of the ancient Chinese Book of Changes, the I Ching.

First the user poses a question. Then they meditate upon it while playing the game. When they attain a '4-way' match, Ishido, utilizing the same algorithm as the authentic yarrow stalk method of consulting the oracle, obtains an answer.

An original translation of the I Ching, which used the Wilhelm/Baynes and Anthony translations as primary sources, was written for the game by Michael Feinberg.

Ishido came with a 20-page booklet, "The Legend of Ishido". It began:

One misty spring morning in 1989, in the remote mountains of China's Han Shan province, a Mendicant monk of the Northern School of the White Crane branch of Taoism, walked silently out through the front gates of the Heavenly Peak Temple

The monk carried a stone board, a set of seventy-two carved stone pieces, and an ancient scroll inscribed with brush and ink in elegant calligraphic script.

He also carried with him a secret which had lain cloistered and hidden for thousands of years.

The story was fictional and written by Michael Feinberg. Nevertheless, many believed that Ishido actually was an ancient game, recently re-discovered.

== Release ==
After Epyx failed to publish it for Christmas '89, the original Ishido game was published by Publishing International in a limited edition in a hand-made walnut slip box with disks for Mac and Mac II. The limited edition retailed for $495. Then the following year, 1990, Accolade published the first mass-market version for the Macintosh, with conversions to MS-DOS, Amiga, Game Boy, and Genesis in the same year. A Famicom Disk System version was released only in Japan in 1990. An Atari Lynx version was released by Atari Corporation in 1991. The Microsoft Entertainment Pack contains an adaptation of Ishido called Stones.

== Reception ==
Reception

Review score
Publication	Score
GamePro	GB: 18/25

Compute! called the Macintosh version of Ishido "addictive ... a peaceful encounter with an Oriental flavor". The New York Times wrote that it "is one of those deceptively simple games, like Go, that gradually reveal their subtleties ... most engrossing". Computer Gaming World called the game "a remarkably complex entertainment resource, with some pleasant surprises". The magazine liked Ishido's VGA graphics, and concluded that it would please both novice and experienced strategy game players. The Atari Lynx version of the game was reviewed in 1992 in Dragon #181 by Hartley, Patricia, and Kirk Lesser in "The Role of Computers" column. The reviewers gave the game 5 out of 5 stars. Entertainment Weekly gave the game a B+.

Ishido was rated 'Five Mice' by MacUser, which called it a "flawless" strategy game "in the 'a minute to learn, a lifetime to master' tradition" but criticized the limited edition release's price. PC Magazine said the game was simple enough to be almost immediately accessible and enjoyable, yet complex enough to provide hours and hours of challenging play. Reviewing Ishido's re-release in 1995, MacUser gave it 4 out of 5 mice. Macworld named the Macintosh version of Ishido: The Way of Stones the Best Brain Teaser game of 1990, complimenting its need for strategy and "entrancing" graphics, alongside the feature of being able to create custom gamepieces; Macworld put Ishido into their Macintosh Game Hall of Fame.

== Legacy ==
The Genesis port of the game was involved in the copyright trial, Sega v. Accolade.
