= Sega v. Accolade =

1992 American court case

- Court: United States Court of Appeals for the Ninth Circuit
- Full case name: Sega Enterprises Ltd. vs Accolade, Inc.
- Argued: July 20, 1992
- Decided: October 20, 1992
- Citation: 977 F.2d 1510 (9th Cir. 1992)

Holding
- Accolade's acts of reverse engineering Sega Genesis software to learn about its security systems and subsequent publishing of unlicensed Sega Genesis games are protected under the fair use doctrine of copyright law. Sega is held responsible for using its security system to place its trademark on Accolade's games.

Court membership
- Judges sitting: Stephen Reinhardt, William C. Canby, Jr., Edward Leavy

Case opinions
- Majority: Stephen Reinhardt

Laws applied
- 15 U.S.C. §§ 1114(1)(a), 1125(a) (Lanham Act); 17 U.S.C. §§ 101, 106, 107, 117 (Copyright Act of 1976)

Sega Enterprises Ltd. v. Accolade, Inc., 977 F.2d 1510 (9th Cir. 1992), is a case in which the United States Court of Appeals for the Ninth Circuit applied American intellectual property law to the reverse engineering of computer software. Stemming from the publishing of several Sega Genesis games by video game publisher Accolade, which had disassembled Genesis software in order to publish games without being licensed by Sega, the case involved several overlapping issues, including the scope of copyright, permissible uses for trademarks, and the scope of the fair use doctrine for computer code.

The case was filed in the U.S. District Court for the Northern District of California, which ruled in favor of Sega and issued an injunction against Accolade preventing them from publishing any more games for the Genesis and requiring them to recall all the existing Genesis games they had for sale. Accolade appealed the decision to the Ninth Circuit on the grounds that their reverse engineering of the Genesis was protected under fair use. The Ninth Circuit reversed the district court's order and ruled that Accolade's use of reverse engineering to publish Genesis titles was protected under fair use, and that its alleged violation of Sega trademarks was the fault of Sega. The case is frequently cited in matters involving reverse engineering and fair use under copyright law.

== Background ==
In March 1984, Sega Enterprises Ltd. was purchased by its former CEO, David Rosen, along with a group of backers. Hayao Nakayama, one of these backers, was named the new CEO of Sega. Following the crash of the arcade industry, Nakayama decided to focus development efforts on the home console market. During this time, Sega became concerned about software and hardware piracy in Southeast Asia, and particularly in Taiwan. Taiwan was not a signatory of the Berne Convention on copyright, limiting Sega's legal options in that region. However, Taiwan did allow prosecution for trademark infringement. Though Sega had created security systems in their consoles to keep their software from being pirated and to keep unlicensed publishers out, much like its competitor Nintendo, counterfeiters had discovered ways to prevent the Sega trademark from appearing on their games, bypassing the trademark altogether.

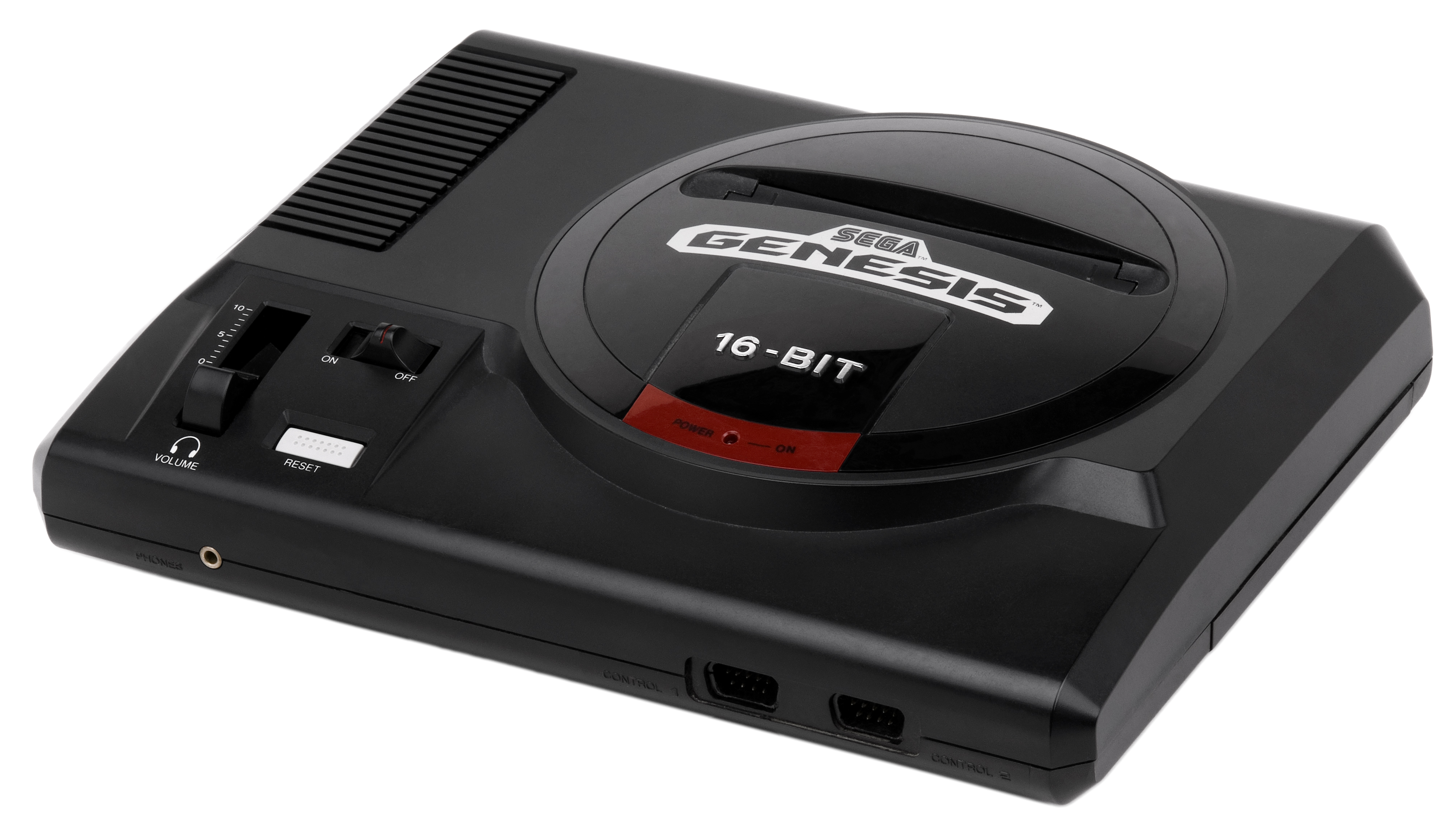
The third version of the model 1 Genesis was the model at the center of Sega v. Accolade for its incorporation of the Trademark Security System (TMSS).

After the release of the Sega Genesis in 1988, video game publisher Accolade began exploring options to release some of their PC game titles onto the console. At the time, however, Sega had a licensing deal in place for third-party developers that increased the costs to the developer. According to Accolade co-founder Alan Miller, "One pays them between $10 and $15 per cartridge on top of the real hardware manufacturing costs, so it about doubles the cost of goods to the independent publisher." In addition to this, Sega required that it would be the exclusive publisher of Accolade's games if Accolade were to be licensed, preventing Accolade from releasing its games to other systems. To get around licensing, Accolade chose to seek an alternative way to bring their games to the Genesis by purchasing a console in order to decompile the executable code of three Genesis games and use it to program their new cartridges in a way that would allow them to disable the security lockouts that prevented playing of unlicensed games. This was done successfully to bring Ishido: The Way of Stones to the Genesis in 1990. In doing so, Accolade had also copied Sega's copyrighted game code multiple times in order to reverse engineer the software of Sega's licensed Genesis games.

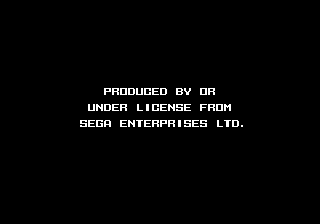
The screen displayed by the Trademark Security System (TMSS)

As a result of the piracy and unlicensed development issues, Sega incorporated a technical protection mechanism into a new edition of the Genesis released in 1991, referred to as the Genesis III. (Note: "Genesis III" likely refers to the third revision of the Genesis motherboard in North America (VA6); not to be confused with the Majesco-produced Genesis 3.) This new variation of the Genesis included code known as the Trademark Security System (TMSS), which, when a game cartridge was inserted into the console, would check for the presence of the string "SEGA" at a particular point in the memory contained in the cartridge. If and only if the string was present, the console would run the game, and would briefly display the message: "Produced by or under license from Sega Enterprises LTD." This system had a twofold effect: it added extra protection against unlicensed developers and software piracy, and it forced the Sega trademark to display when the game was powered up, making a lawsuit for trademark infringement possible if unlicensed software were to be developed. Accolade learned of this development at the Winter Consumer Electronics Show in January 1991, at which Sega showed the new Genesis III and demonstrated it screening and rejecting an Ishido game cartridge. With more games planned for the following year, Accolade successfully identified the TMSS code. They later added this code to the games HardBall!, Star Control, Mike Ditka Power Football, and Turrican.

== Lawsuit ==
On October 31, 1991, Sega filed suit against Accolade in the United States District Court for the Northern District of California, on charges of trademark infringement and unfair competition in violation of the Lanham Act. Copyright infringement, a violation of the Copyright Act of 1976, was added a month later to the list of charges. In response, Accolade filed a counterclaim for falsifying the source of its games by displaying the Sega trademark when the game was powered up. The case was heard by Judge Barbara A. Caulfield.

Sega argued that Accolade had infringed upon its copyrights because Accolade's games contained Sega's material. Accolade insisted that their use of Sega's material constituted fair use. However, Judge Caulfield did not accept this explanation since Accolade was a game manufacturer, their works were for financial gain, and because their works competed directly with Sega's licensed games, likely resulting in a sales decrease for Sega's games. Accolade's case was further hurt by a presentation by a Sega engineer named Takeshi Nagashima, who showed two Sega game cartridges that were able to run on the Genesis III without the trademark-displaying TMSS, and offered them to Accolade's defense team but would not reveal how that was possible. Ultimately, this would result in Accolade's defeat on April 3, 1992, when Judge Caulfield ruled in favor of Sega and issued an injunction prohibiting future sales by Accolade of Genesis-compatible games incorporating the Sega message or using the results of the reverse engineering. Almost a week later, Accolade was also required by the court to recall all of their Genesis-compatible games.

== Appeal ==
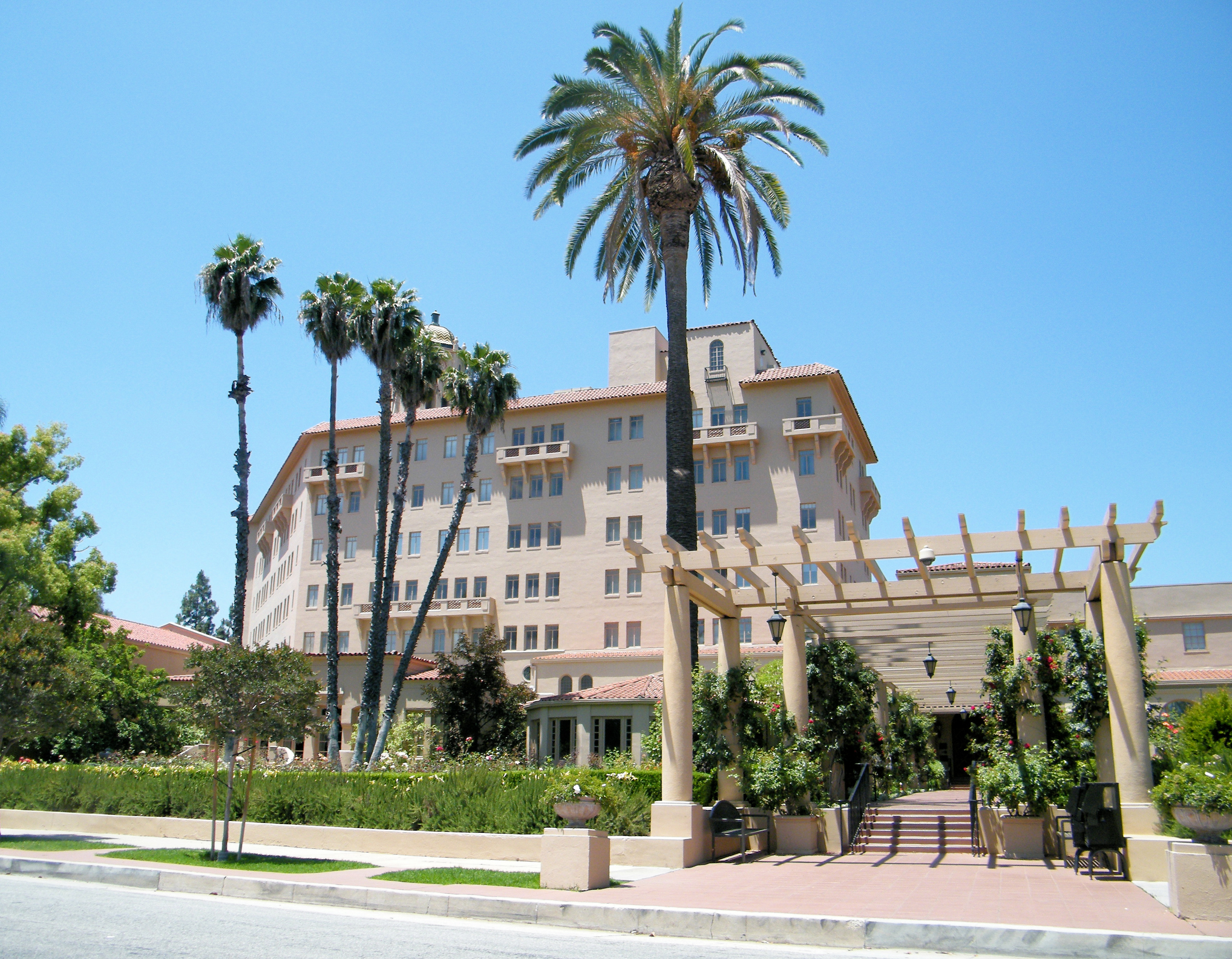
The Richard H. Chambers U.S. Court of Appeals Building, U.S. Court of Appeals for the Ninth Circuit, Pasadena, California

The decision in the district court ruling had been very costly to Accolade. According to Accolade co-founder Alan Miller, "Just to fight the injunction, we had to pay at least half a million dollars in legal fees." On April 14, 1992, Accolade asked the district court to stay the preliminary injunction pending appeal, but when the court did not rule by April 21, Accolade appealed the injunction to the Ninth Circuit of the U.S. Court of Appeals. A stay was granted on the mandate to recall all of Accolade's Genesis games, but the injunction preventing further reverse engineering and development of Genesis software was maintained until August 28, when the Ninth Circuit ordered it dissolved pending the appeal review.

In support of the appeal, the Computer & Communications Industry Association submitted an amicus curiae brief claiming that the district court had made errors in concluding that Accolade had infringed upon Sega's copyright by reverse engineering its software, extending copyright protection to method of operation, and failing to consider whether Accolade's games were substantially similar to Sega's copyrighted material. Amicus briefs were also submitted by the American Committee for Interoperable Systems, the Computer and Business Equipment Manufacturers Association, and copyright law professor Dennis S. Karjala from Arizona State University.

In reviewing the case, the court considered several factors in its own analysis, examining trademark and copyright issues separately. As in the district court proceedings, Nagashima showed the court a game cartridge that ran on the Genesis that did not display the trademark logo. However, the court was not moved by this, deciding that Nagashima's cartridges showed what one could do with knowledge of the TMSS, which Accolade did not possess. According to the court, because knowledge of how to avoid displaying the trademark on the Genesis III was not information that was public to the industry, Sega's attempt to prove that the display of their trademark was not required for games to be played on the console was insufficient. Writing for the opinion of the court, Judge Stephen Reinhardt stated, "Sega knowingly risked two significant consequences: the false labeling of some competitors' products and the discouraging of other competitors from manufacturing Genesis-compatible games. Under the Lanham Act, the former conduct, at least, is clearly unlawful." The court then went on to cite Anti-Monopoly v. General Mills Fun Group, which states in reference to the Lanham Act, "The trademark is misused if it serves to limit competition in the manufacture and sales of a product. That is the special province of the limited monopolies provided pursuant to the patent laws." The judges in the case had decided that Sega had violated this provision of the act by utilizing its trademark to limit competition for software for its console.

To determine the status of Accolade's claim of fair use of Sega's copyrighted game code, the court reviewed four criteria of fair use: the nature of the copyrighted work, the amount of the copyrighted work used, the purpose of use, and the effects of use on the market for the work. Of note to the judges in reviewing Sega's copyright claim was the difference in size between the TMSS file and the sizes of Accolade's games. As noted by Judge Reinhardt in writing the opinion of the court, the TMSS file "contains approximately twenty to twenty-five bytes of data. Each of Accolade's games contains a total of 500,000 to 1,500,000 bytes. According to Accolade employees, the header file is the only portion of Sega's code that Accolade copied into its own game programs." This made the games overwhelmingly original content, and according to Judge Reinhardt, to the benefit of the public to be able to compete with Sega's licensed games, especially if the games were dissimilar as contended in the appeal. The court did not accept the argument that Accolade's games competed directly with Sega's, noting that there was no proof that any of Accolade's published games had diminished the market for any of Sega's games. Despite claims from Sega's attorneys that the company had invested much time and effort into developing the Genesis, and that Accolade was capitalizing on this time and energy, the court rejected these claims by noting that U.S. Supreme Court in Feist v. Rural Publications had unequivocally rejected the notion that copyright protection could be based on the "sweat of the brow," i.e., that a work was entitled to copyright because of the amount of effort it took to create it. The court also noted that the Sega code contained some functional elements that were not protected under the Copyright Act of 1976. On the matter of reverse engineering as a process, the court concluded that "where disassembly is the only way to gain access to the ideas and functional elements embodied in a copyrighted computer program and where there is a legitimate reason for seeking such access, disassembly is a fair use of the copyrighted work, as a matter of law."

On August 28, 1992, the Ninth Circuit reversed the district court's preliminary injunction and ruled that Accolade's decompilation of the Sega software constituted fair use. The court's written opinion followed on October 20 and noted that the use of the software was non-exploitative, despite being commercial, and that the trademark infringement, being required by the TMSS for a Genesis game to run on the system, was inadvertently triggered by a fair use act and the fault of Sega for causing false labeling. As a result of the verdict being overturned, the costs of the appeal were assessed to Sega. The injunction remained in force, however, because Sega petitioned the appeals court to rehear the case.

== Settlement ==
On January 8, 1993, with Sega's petition for a rehearing still pending, the court took the unusual step of amending its October 20, 1992 opinion and lifted the injunction preventing Accolade from developing or selling Genesis software. This was followed by a formal denial of Sega's petition for a rehearing on January 26. As Accolade's counterclaim for false labeling under the Lanham Act was declined by the Ninth Circuit, this essentially left "each party as free to act as it was before the issuance of preliminary injunctive relief" while the district court considered the counterclaim. Sega and Accolade ultimately settled on April 30, 1993. As a part of this settlement, Accolade became an official licensee of Sega, and later developed and released Barkley Shut Up and Jam! while under license. The terms of the licensing, including whether or not any special arrangements or discounts were made to Accolade, were not released to the public. The financial terms of the settlement were also not disclosed, although both companies agreed to pay their own legal costs.

In an official statement, Sega of America chairman David Rosen expressed satisfaction with the settlement. According to Rosen, "This settlement is a satisfactory ending to what was a very complex set of issues. Not only are we pleased to settle this case amicably, we've also turned a corner in our association with Accolade and now look forward to a healthy and mutually beneficial relationship in the future." Accolade's Alan Miller expressed more excitement with the settlement and the opportunities it presented for the company, saying in his statement, "We are very pleased with the settlement, and we're excited about the new markets it opens to Accolade. Accolade currently experiences strong demand for its Sega Genesis products in North America and Europe. We will now be able to publish our products on the Sega Genesis and Game Gear systems throughout the world." Despite the settlement, however, Accolade had lost somewhere between $15 million and $25 million during the injunction period, according to Miller.

== Impact ==
Sega's logo

Sega v. Accolade has been an influential case in matters involving reverse engineering of software and copyright infringement, and has been cited in numerous cases since 1993. The case redefined how reverse engineering with unlicensed products is seen in legal issues involving copyright. The decision was also as influential because it was issued by the U.S. Court of Appeals for the Ninth Circuit, whose jurisdiction included all states in the western United States where the majority of U.S.-based software development occurred, including California and Washington. The case also helped establish guidelines for permissible reverse engineering; for example, American computer programmer Andrew Schulman cited the decision with approval in his 1994 book "Undocumented Dos," which explored and revealed undocumented functionality in Microsoft operating systems that he had uncovered using disassembly and reverse engineering. The process that Accolade undertook to reverse engineer the Sega code was perceived as fairly typical to the way other companies had been conducting reverse engineering, which made the court's decision even more influential. The Ninth Circuit's decision confirmed that the console's functional principles were not protected by copyright, and also established that reverse engineering can constitute "fair use" when no other means were available to access information about the console's functional principles. One such example of the precedent set by this case is Sony Computer Entertainment, Inc. v. Connectix Corporation, which was issued in 2000 by the Ninth Circuit, specifically cited Sega v. Accolade in deciding that reverse engineering the Sony PlayStation BIOS was protected by fair use and was non-exploitative.

Among the influences of the decision include Sega v. Accolade's effect on the criteria for fair use and the responsibilities of trademark holders in legal examinations. Although Accolade had copied entire Genesis games in order to identify the TMSS, the court gave little weight to the criterion on the amount of the copyrighted work being copied, in light of the fact that Accolade had done so in order to create their own compatible software. Likewise, the nature of the work was also given less weight, essentially establishing a two-factor approach to evaluating fair use in the purpose of use and impact on the market. It was also the first time that the Lanham Act was interpreted to mean that confusion resulting from the placement of one's trademark on another work by means of a security program is the fault of the original registrant of the trademark.

Sega v. Accolade also served to help establish that the functional principles of computer software cannot be protected by copyright law. Rather, the only legal protection to such principles can be through holding a patent or by trade secret. This aspect of the decision has received criticism as well, citing that although the functional principles are not protectable under copyright law, the TMSS code was protectable and by allowing reverse engineering of the TMSS as fair use, the decision had encouraged the copying of legally protected programs.

== See also ==
- Vault Corp. v. Quaid Software Ltd.
- Atari Games Corp. v. Nintendo of America Inc.
