= Connectix Virtual Game Station =

PlayStation emulator

Virtual Game Station
- Windows GUI of Virtual Game Station
- Original author: Aaron Giles
- Developer: Connectix
- Release: January 5, 1999; 27 years ago
- Stable release: 1.4.1 / October 11, 2000; 26 years ago
- Operating system: Classic Mac OS, Windows
- Type: Emulator
- License: Proprietary
- Website: "Virtual Game Station" at the Wayback Machine (archive index)

The Virtual Game Station (VGS, code named Bonestorm) is a discontinued emulator by Connectix that allows PlayStation games to be played on a desktop computer. It was first released for the Macintosh, in 1999, after being previewed at Macworld/iWorld the same year by Steve Jobs and Phil Schiller. VGS was created by Aaron Giles. The recompiling CPU emulator was written by Eric Traut.

Released at a time when the Sony PlayStation was at its peak of popularity, Virtual Game Station was the first PlayStation emulator, for any platform, that enabled games to run at full speed on modestly powerful computer hardware, and the first that supported the vast majority of PlayStation games. It was advertised as running at full speed on the original 233 MHz iMac G3 system (relying on its built-in ATi graphics hardware).

The impact of this product changed the available Macintosh game library from a very small, select group to nearly the entire collection of PlayStation games. Graphics could be run full screen, at full speed. Several PlayStation-type hand controllers became available with VGS in mind. The only lacking features were the ability to receive DualShock force-feedback or use light-guns.

VGS was initially released for NTSC based PlayStation games but later versions were made for PAL based games. Like the PS1, the system was region locked, and copied games would not work either, although it didn't take too long for the hacker community to release a "Mod Chipped" version. Versions 1.1 and 1.2 of VGS attempted to make "modding" more difficult but were soon modified as well.

VGS proved to be extremely popular, as it cost less than half the price of a PlayStation and did not require any extra hardware. VGS was later ported to Microsoft Windows. It was slightly less popular there due to competition with other emulators such as bleem!, though it did have better compatibility.

Sony perceived VGS as a threat, and filed a lawsuit against Connectix for copyright infringement. The case was eventually closed in favor of Connectix, but Connectix was unable to sell the software in the meantime because Sony had been awarded a temporary injunction. Soon thereafter, Sony purchased VGS from Connectix and discontinued it.

== Reception ==
Inside Mac Games gave a rating of four and a half out of five and called it "[...] an excellent companion to your Macintosh game collection."

== See also ==
- Reverse engineering
