= MODE32 =

Software for Apple computers

- MODE32 version 7.5 icon
- Developer: Connectix
- Release: June 1991; 35 years ago
- Final release: 7.5 / September 7, 1994; 31 years ago
- Operating system: Classic Mac OS
- Type: Utility software
- License: Proprietary commercial software, later made available as freeware

MODE32 is a software product originally developed by Connectix for certain models of the Apple Macintosh. It was published in June 1991 and originally cost US$169; however, on September 5, 1991, the software was made available free to customers under licensing terms with Apple Computer.

== Overview ==
MODE32 patches the ROM code in certain models of early 68020 and 68030 Apple Macintosh computers (see "Affected models" below) which were advertised by Apple to support 32-bit memory management. Despite the machines' hardware being designed to support 32-bit mode, the lack of a 32-bit Memory Manager in ROM forced these machines to run in 24-bit mode, which crippled these otherwise high-end machines to support only 8 MB of RAM. Prior to licensing MODE32, Apple had been subject to many complaints from individuals over the lack of 32-bit support.

Versions of MODE32 prior to 7.5 include a control panel under Macintosh System 7 that lets the user enable or disable MODE32. The option to enable 32-bit addressing can be found in the Memory control panel when MODE32 is enabled. Otherwise, the option is not displayed.

For System 7.0 and 7.1, MODE32 version 1.2 was recommended. In the case of System 7.5 (and if Thread Manager was loaded), Connectix specifically recommends MODE32 7.5 in order to avoid problems with file corruption. If MODE32 1.2 was installed over 7.5, Connectix recommends a complete reinstall of the operating system.

Generally, 32-bit addressing is only needed when large amounts of RAM are needed or when a piece of software requires it. Running non-32-bit-clean software in 32-bit mode on any Macintosh can cause crashes and data corruption. With MODE32 installed, holding down the Esc key on the keyboard as soon as the machine is powered on causes the system to run in 24-bit mode for the current session.

Mac OS 7.6 and later require 32-bit "clean" ROMs and do not require this utility. MODE32 is a descendant of Connectix's earlier OPTIMA, which also enables 32-bit addressing but for System 6. Connectix also offered three similar products, MAXIMA, RAM Doubler, and Virtual; the former implemented a RAM disk and latter two adding virtual memory (with compression in RAM Doubler's case) in addition to allowing addressing 14 MB under 24-bit addressing.

== Affected models ==
- Macintosh SE/30
- Macintosh II
- Macintosh IIx
- Macintosh IIcx

Other models do not need MODE32 because they either do not support 32-bit addressing at all or support it exclusively.
