= Eric Traut =

American software engineer

- Education: Stanford University
- Occupation: Software engineer
- Employer: Microsoft
- Known for: Virtual PC, Virtual Game Station
- Title: Technical Fellow

Eric Traut is an American software engineer and software emulation pioneer. Traut graduated from Stanford University in 1992. From 1993 to 1995 he worked for Apple Computer, creating a Mac 68K emulator to be used in PowerPC-based Macintoshes. His work on this project led to a patent on a form of dynamic recompilation.

Traut went on to join Connectix, where he developed successful commercial emulators such as Virtual PC and Virtual Game Station. He became Connectix's Chief Technical Officer in 2001.

Traut became a Microsoft employee after the company purchased Connectix in 2003. Traut left Microsoft in late 2012. He rejoined Microsoft in May 2014 and was a Technical Fellow at Microsoft till 2023. He is now employed with OpenAI and works on Codex.
