= Connectix =

Software and hardware company

Connectix Corporation
- Type: Subsidiary of Microsoft
- Industry: Computer software and hardware
- Founded: October 1988
- Defunct: August 2003
- Fate: Sold QuickCam to Logitech, sold Virtual Game Station to Sony, sold Virtual PC to Microsoft, discontinued other products
- Key people: Jon Garber; Bonnie Fought; Roy McDonald; Eric Traut; Jorg Brown
- Products: Virtual; MODE32; Optima; MAXIMA; RAM Doubler; Speed Doubler; QuickCam; DoubleTalk; Virtual Game Station; Virtual PC; Virtual Server
- Parent: Microsoft Corporation
- Website: connectix.com at the Wayback Machine (archived 2003-04-08)

Connectix Corporation was a software and hardware company that released innovative products that were either made obsolete as Apple Computer incorporated the ideas into system software, or were sold to other companies once they became popular. It was formed in October 1988 by Jon Garber; the dominant board members and co-founders were Garber, Bonnie Fought (the two were later married), and close friend Roy McDonald. McDonald was still Chief Executive Officer and president when Connectix finally closed in August 2003.

== Products ==
Primary products included these:

- Virtual: Its original flagship product, which introduced virtual memory to the Macintosh operating system, Mac OS, years before Apple's implementation in System 7. Virtual also runs on a motley assortment of accelerator cards for the original Mac, Mac Plus, and Mac SE, which were not supported by Apple.
- HandOff II: The file launcher developed by Fred Hollander of Utilitron, Inc. This INIT for Macintosh solved the "Application Not Found" problem by launching a substitute application for the one that created the file the user was trying to open. Apple would later build a similar functionality into System 7.
- SuperMenu: The first commercial hierarchical Apple menu, developed by Fred Hollander of Utilitron, Inc. Again, Apple would make a hierarchal Apple menu standard in System 7, by buying one of the many shareware versions of the same concept.
- MODE32: Software which allows 32-bit memory management on "32-bit dirty" Macintosh systems. Later bought by Apple and distributed for free, at least in part to settle a class-action lawsuit brought by customers who demanded to know why their 32-bit 68020 microprocessors could not access more than 8 megabytes of RAM.
- Optima: Makes System 6 32-bit clean and puts a Macintosh IIsi into 32-bit mode. This makes all of the physical RAM addressable by System 6. It can have one application open at a time.
- MAXIMA: A RAM disk utility, better than the one that later came with Mac OS as it saved its contents before and after reboots, while also allowing booting from the RAM disk.
- Connectix Desktop Utilities (CDU): A collection of utilities for desktop systems, including utilities for power management (screen dimming and automatic power down), synchronizing files when multiple disks are used, and custom desktop background images. A version of the CDU software received an Energy Star Compliant Controlling Device status from the US Environmental Protection Agency (EPA) on the basis of the software's power management functionality.
- Connectix Powerbook Utilities (CPU): A collection of utilities designed to simplify common tasks for laptop users.
- RAM Doubler: The first product to combine compression with virtual memory. A top selling Mac utility for many years which eventually was made obsolete as Apple improved their own virtual memory. There is also a RAM Doubler for Windows 3.1 which uses compression to increase system resources, allowing more applications to run. RAM Doubler was something of a case study for porting Macintosh products to the PowerPC processor, as CEO Roy McDonald presented a paper detailing the company's porting efforts at the Sumeria Technology and Issues Conference on June 30, 1994.
- Agent95: The replacement for the Windows side of RAM Doubler. In addition to being updated with Windows 95 support, it also added resource monitoring capabilities.
- Speed Doubler: Software that combines an enhanced disk cache called Speed Access, better Finder copy utility called Speed Copy, and a dynamically recompiling 68K-to-PowerPC emulator called Speed Emulator, which is faster than both the interpretive emulator that shipped in the original PowerPCs and the dynamically recompiling emulator that Apple shipped in later machines. It was made obsolete as 68K applications became less common and OS code improved, though its better Finder copy utility would be spun off into its own OS 9 compatible product called CopyAgent.
- Surf Express: A local proxy server designed to accelerate the web browsing experience by caching and auto-refreshing frequently visited web sites. Offered for both Mac OS and Windows 95.
- QuickCam: The first webcam. Originally the sole design of Jon Garber, he wanted to call it the "Mac-camera", but was vetoed by marketing, who saw the possibility of it one day becoming a cross-platform product. It became the first Connectix Windows product 14 months later, with RAM Doubler for Windows 3.1 being the next. The Mac QuickCam shipped in August 1994, RAM Doubler for Windows in April 1995, and QuickCam for Windows in October 1995. The line was sold to Logitech in August 1998 for $25 million. QuickCam is now considered one of the top gadgets of all time.
- DoubleTalk: Access Windows-Based Network Resources - Access Windows fileservers, transfer files to and from shared Windows workstations over the network and print to shared PC-based PostScript printers.
- Virtual Game Station: PlayStation emulation software. Sold to Sony, who bought it only after their lawsuit to stop it failed, and then dropped the product immediately.
- Virtual PC and Virtual server: Emulation software of x86-based personal computers for the Macintosh, Windows and OS/2. Sold to Microsoft, the transaction was completed on February 18, 2003.

With the sale of Virtual PC development and support, staff were transferred to Microsoft, including Connectix's Chief Technical Officer Eric Traut, but not including any of the Connectix board members or Technical Support. Its Macintosh products, including DoubleTalk, CopyAgent and RAM Doubler, were discontinued.
