= SheepShaver =

Open source PowerPC Apple Macintosh emulator

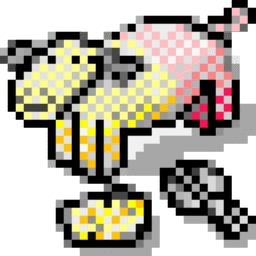

- SheepShaver running Mac OS 9 on Windows 11
- Developers: Christian Bauer, Gwenole Beauchesne
- Release: 1998; 28 years ago
- Final release: 2.5 / September 13, 2022; 3 years ago
- Preview release: 2.5
- Operating system: BeOS, Linux, Mac OS X, Windows
- Type: Emulator
- License: GPL
- Website: https://sheepshaver.cebix.net/
- Repository: github.com/cebix/macemu

SheepShaver is an open-source PowerPC Apple Macintosh emulator originally designed for BeOS and Linux. The name is a play on ShapeShifter, a Macintosh II emulator for AmigaOS (made obsolete by Basilisk II). The ShapeShifter and SheepShaver projects were originally conceived and programmed by Christian Bauer and are now developed by Gwenolé Beauchesne.

== History ==
History

SheepShaver was originally commercial software when first released in 1998, but after the demise of Be Inc., the maker of BeOS, it became open source in 2002. It can be run on both PowerPC and x86 systems; however, it runs more slowly on an x86 system than on a PowerPC system, because of the translation between the PowerPC and Intel x86 instruction sets. SheepShaver has been ported to both Microsoft Windows and Linux.

As free software, a few variants exist to simplify the installation process on Intel-based Macs:

- 'Sheep Shaver Wrapper' is built off of Sheep Shaver but it does some of the bundling work for the user.
- 'Chubby Bunny' also simplifies the set up process of OS 9 visualization on Intel Macs running OS X.

SheepShaver was "incredibly popular within the vintage Macintosh software community" according to Wiley's 2016 Companion to Digital Art.

== Features ==
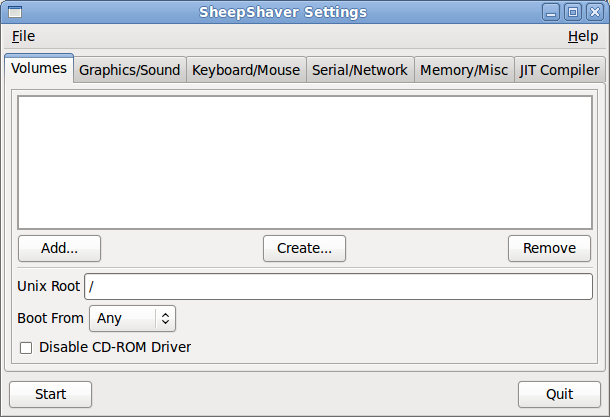
SheepShaver setup menu on Linux

SheepShaver is capable of running Mac OS 7.5.2 through 9.0.4 (though it needs the image of an Old World ROM to run Mac OS 8.1 or below), and can be run inside a window so that the user can run classic Mac OS and either BeOS, Intel-based Mac OS X, Linux, or Windows applications at the same time.

Although SheepShaver has Ethernet support and CD-quality sound output, it does not emulate the memory management unit. Because of this, Mac OS 9.1 through 9.2.2, the final release, are not supported. While the adding of this functionality through emulation has been discussed, it has not been added because of the time and effort required in implementing it.

== See also ==
- PearPC
- vMac
- Basilisk II
- Classic Environment
- Executor
