= SoundJam MP =

Music player software acquired by Apple

- Original authors: Bill Kincaid, Jeff Robbin and Dave Heller
- Developer: Casady & Greene
- Release: July 14, 1999; 27 years ago
- Final release: 2.5.3 / April 11, 2001; 25 years ago
- Operating system: Mac OS 8, Mac OS 9
- Type: Media player, handheld device synchronizer
- License: Proprietary commercial software
- Website: soundjam.com at the Wayback Machine (archived 2001-03-02)

SoundJam MP is a discontinued MP3 player for classic Mac OS-compatible computers and Rio-compatible hardware synchronization manager that was released in July 1999 and was available until June 2001. Jeff Robbin and Bill Kincaid developed SoundJam MP with assistance from Dave Heller. Robbin and Kincaid chose Casady & Greene to publish SoundJam MP. Apple Computer purchased SoundJam MP in 2000 and further developed the code to create iTunes version 1.0. Casady and Greene ceased publication of SoundJam MP in June 2001 at the request of the developers.

== History ==
SoundJam MP Free audio player interface and master playlist window

Prior to working together on SoundJam MP, Jeff Robbin and Bill Kincaid had worked for Apple in the 1990s as system software engineers assigned to the Copland operating system, a project that was abandoned before completion. After the Copland project's cancellation, Robbin and Kincaid left Apple. Robbin went on to create Conflict Catcher, a Mac OS utility, and Kincaid worked at a startup.

Kincaid created Mac-compatible hardware and device driver support for the Diamond Rio line of digital audio players. He then enlisted Robbin to develop the front-end for the MP3-player software they named SoundJam MP. Dave Heller later joined them, completing the core team. The development team chose Casady & Greene to publish SoundJam MP because the company had previously published Robbin's Conflict Catcher. David Pogue, who later became a New York Times columnist, wrote SoundJam MP's documentation.

The sound that plays upon the completion of a disc burning was created by Kelly Jacklin, who was an audio engineer at Apple and a hobbyist musician. He created various three note combinations using multiple synthesized instruments. The sound was later used in iTunes for the same purpose, and eventually became the default iPhone alert tone under the name Tri-Tone.

SoundJam was released a few weeks before a competing Mac MP3 player, Audion, made by Panic Inc. According to Cabel Sasser, Panic's co-founder, the competition between SoundJam and Audion was friendly and "inspiring."

== Reception ==
SoundJam received positive reviews, and won the Best of Macworld award in 1999; it eventually secured 90% of the Mac MP3 software market. SoundJam competed with the Audion app, made by Panic. Apple hired Robbin, Kincaid and Heller, and used SoundJam's code as the foundation for iTunes.

Both companies were vying to be acquired by Apple, but since Panic was already discussing a buyout with AOL, and since Robbin and Kincaid were ex-Apple employees, Apple chose to buy SoundJam in 2000.

== Acquisition ==
In early 2000, Apple wanted to purchase MP3 player software for use with Apple's desktop computers. Apple sought meetings with both Panic and Casady & Greene. Caught up in negotiations with AOL, Panic was not able to set up a meeting with Apple. Turning instead to Casady & Greene, Apple purchased the rights to the SoundJam MP software in a deal covered by a two-year secrecy clause.

Working as employees of Apple, Robbin, Kincaid and Heller continued to develop the software which would become iTunes. All three continue to work at Apple; Robbin is the lead developer of iTunes.

On January 9, 2001, Apple debuted iTunes 1.0 to the public. Curious Macintosh users immediately began poking through iTunes' resource fork, where they discovered numerous strings and other resources that indicated iTunes was a re-engineered SoundJam MP.

After a request from Robbin and Kincaid, Casady & Greene ceased distribution of SoundJam MP on June 1, 2001.
