= Nisus Writer =

Word processing program for Apple Macs

- Developers: Nisus Software, Inc.
- Release: 1989; 37 years ago
- Operating system: Classic MacOS, MacOS
- Type: Word processor
- License: Proprietary
- Website: nisus.com

Nisus Writer (known as just Nisus from 1989 to 1993) is a word processor program for Apple Macs, made by California-based Nisus Software, Inc. The program is nowadays available in two varieties: Nisus Writer Express and Nisus Writer Pro.

== History ==
First introduced in 1989, Nisus was the first word processor for Macintosh able to handle multiple type systems within one document, e.g. Arabic, Hebrew, Japanese, etc., thanks to WorldScript. Other distinguishing features of the program were non-contiguous text selection, multiple editable clipboards, one of the earliest implementations of multiple undo, voice recording, and inline annotations. It also offered grep search and replace that was accessed through a graphical dialog box instead of command line options. These features, which were more advanced than those typically found in word processors of the day, were also present in Nisus' QUED/M text editor.

An unusual feature of the Nisus file format was that all font and formatting information was saved in the file's resource fork, with the data fork containing only plain text. Thus, if the file were to be opened in another program on the Mac, or on a Windows PC, the text would be readable (although style information would be lost). This predates cross-platform file formats as used by word processors like Microsoft Word. Contemporary editions of Word had different formats between the Mac and Windows versions and required a translator if their files were to be readable by other programs (or each other) at all. The technique of using the resource fork to store style information was later implemented by Apple Inc. for the standard Macintosh styled text format as used in SimpleText.

In 1992, Nisus Compact was released. It was a reduced version of Nisus for Apple's 68K PowerBooks, that fit entirely within RAM to avoid accessing the hard disk and thereby draining the laptop's battery. It was at first a commercial product, but from 1999 it was given away as a freemium with various books and magazines as part of a marketing campaign. "Upgrades" to Nisus Writer were offered at a discount.

In 1994, with the release of version 4.0, the name of the program was changed from Nisus to Nisus Writer, together with a redesigned interface, support for sound, QuickTime, Publish & Subscribe, text-to-speech, autonumbering, color graphics and table and equation tools.

In 2001, Nisus Writer 6.5, the last classic version of Nisus, was released. It ran under Mac OS 9.2.2 and PowerPC-based Mac OS X, but only in the Classic environment, and is no longer available for purchase.

Rather than porting Nisus Writer to Mac OS X, Nisus Software released a fundamentally different product in 2003 called Nisus Writer Express, which they had bought from its original developer Charles Jolley. Originally known as Okito Composer, it was based on Cocoa and complied with Apple's Mac OS X user interface guidelines. They hired Jolley as managing director, in which capacity he oversaw further development of the word processor he had created. Jolley left Nisus in 2005, after which he worked for Apple from 2006 to 2010 and Facebook from 2011 to 2013.

In 2007, Nisus Software released Nisus Writer Pro, a more advanced version of Nisus Writer Express, intended more for business and designed as an alternative to the Mac version of Microsoft Word. It supported more file formats and by 2011 it had features such as comments, mail merge, go to page, track changes, drawing tools and watermarks.

== Current product range ==
As of December 2023, the latest versions of the two word processors, Nisus Writer Express 4.2 and Nisus Writer Pro 3.2, are both compatible with macOS Sonoma.

== Reception ==
Macworld gave version 2.1.1 of Nisus Writer Express a rating of four out of five and wrote: "[...] although Nisus Writer Express doesn't include outlining, that program’s customization options, powerful text-processing tools, and uncluttered look will appeal to a wide variety of users."

== See also ==
- List of word processors
- Comparison of word processors
- OpenDocument software
- Office Open XML software
- MathMagic, an equation editor compatible with Nisus Writer, supporting automatic baseline alignment
