= QUED/M =

QUED and QUED/M are text editors for the classic Mac OS operating system, developed by Paragon Concepts, which later became Nisus Software, Inc. While it is still distributed and supported it has not been updated since 1997. The Initial incarnation, QUED (QUality EDitor, released 1985), gave programmers a versatile text editor superior to the bundled Edit application. QUED/M, released in 1987, added a macro system.

The macro language consisted of two "dialects", the Menu Command Dialect and the Programming Dialect. The Menu Command dialect (not based on anything, because nothing like it was known) used each menu command of the application to execute the respective command. Extensions to that were used to specify details of how the command was to be executed. The programming dialect was not based on any other programming language. This was back-ported from Nisus Writer version 4.x when a similar programming dialect was added to that program's macro capability.

QUED/M competed with Apple's Macintosh Programmer's Workshop Shell and other Macintosh integrated development environments of the time. QUED/M was gradually supplanted by BBEdit, which offered much better integration with many technologies in System 7. QUED/M served as the foundation of Nisus Writer, first released in 1989 as Nisus.

QUED/M does not run natively on Mac OS X, hence it requires the Mac Classic Environment, and cannot run in Mac OS X v10.5 or later or on Intel-based Macs.
