= CherryOS =

PowerPC G4 emulator

- Original author: Arben Kryeziu
- Developer: Maui X-Stream
- Release: October 12, 2004 (soft launch)
- Operating system: Microsoft Windows
- Platform: x86
- Type: PowerPC G4 processor emulator
- License: Commercial (2004-06); Open-source software (2006-)
- Website: cherryos.com (offline)

CherryOS was a PowerPC G4 processor emulator for x86 Microsoft Windows platforms, which allowed various Apple Inc. programs to be operated on Windows XP. Announced and made available for pre-orders on October 12, 2004, it was developed by Maui X-Stream (MXS), a startup company based in Lahaina, Hawaii and a subsidiary of Paradise Television. The program encountered a number of launch difficulties its first year, including a poorly-reviewed soft launch in October 2004, wherein Wired Magazine argued that CherryOS used code grafted directly from PearPC, an older open-source emulator. Lead developer Arben Kryeziu subsequently stated that PearPC had provided the inspiration for CherryOS, but "not the work, not the architecture. With their architecture I'd never get the speed."

After further development, CherryOS 1.0 was released in its final form on March 8, 2005, with support for CD, DVD, USB, FireWire, and Ethernet. It was described as automatically detecting "hardware and network connections" and allowing "for the use of virtually any OS X-ready application," including Safari and Mail. Estimated to be compatible with approximately 70 percent of PCs, MXS again fielded accusations that CherryOS 1.0 incorporated code from PearPC. MXS argued CherryOS was "absolutely not" a knockoff," and that though "certain generic code strings and screen verbiage used in Pear PC are also used in CherryOS... they are not proprietary to the Pear PC product." Shortly afterwards the creators of PearPC were reported to be "contemplating" litigation against Maui X-Stream, and on April 6, 2005, CherryOS was announced to be on hold. A day later, CherryOS announced that "due to overwhelming demand, Cherry open source project launches May 1, 2005."

== History ==
=== Background and development ===
On October 12, 2004, the emulator CherryOS was announced by Maui X-Stream (MXS), a startup company based in Lahaina, Hawaii and a subsidiary of Paradise Television. At the time MXS was best known for developing software for video streaming, particularly their VX3 encoder. As a new emulator intended to allow Mac OS X to be utilized on x86 computer architecture, CherryOS was advertised as working on Windows 98, Windows 2000 or Windows XP, with features such as allowing files to be dragged from PC to Mac, the creation of multiple profiles, and support for networking and sound. With development led by MXS employee and software developer Arben Kryeziu, CherryOS was made available for pre-order on the MXS website.

Some articles hailed CherryOS as a new potential competitor for programs such as MacWindows, while the Irish Times would later write that certain groups of consumers "were suspicious as to how a little-known Hawaii-based outfit... could suddenly do something that had evaded much larger firms." In explaining the suspicion, Ars Technica later noted that emulators by small developers like PearPC had reputations for working extremely slowly, meaning CherryOS's claim of operating 80 percent of the host PC's speed would have been "a major breakthrough" in the industry. When asked by the Star Bulletin, at this point Kryeziu denied any possibility that CherryOS would contain code from a rival program like Apple, MacWindows, Emulators.com, or PearPC, stating that "our lawyers have looked at this and say we're in the clear. We wrote this from scratch and we're clean as a whistle."

According to the Star Bulletin, suspicions that CherryOS might be a hoax "were fanned" by glitches on the CherryOS home website, and three days after the site opened for pre-sales it crashed after taking 300,000 daily hits. MXS president Jim Kartes crediting the crash on both unexpected high traffic and Mac "purists" who had hacked and destroyed the servers, and though MXS continued to accept non-digital pre-orders, by October 19 the CherryOS website was offline entirely as MXS switched to a new web host.

=== Pre-release version ===
Initially the company did not offer a trial version of CherryOS, citing concerns the code might be pirated. However, "as a direct result of the overwhelming response to our October 12 announcement," as of October 15 the company was readying a free beta version with a projected release date of November 25, 2004. On October 18, Kryeziu stated that a free public demo would be released within a week, and CherryOS was first registered to be trademarked in the United States on October 19, 2004. On October 19, however, Kryeziu withheld a timetable for the CherryOS release, stating the company had been pre-emptive in releasing the earlier "soft launch" version, and that CherryOS still had too many software bugs to predict a release date. Wired News reviewed a pre-release version around this time, reporting on October 22 that an expert had found distinguishing "watermarks" from PearPC's source code in CherryOS. Moreover, the pre-release version was reviewed to run at the same slow speed as PearPC, though Wired noted "they've actually done some work on it. They've written a whole graphical interface that makes [PearPC] easier to use."

In response to the article, MXS stated that the edition tested by Wired had been a "very bad...premature version" that "is not CherryOS," and that one of the CherryOS programmers had since been fired for directly grafting elements of PearPC code into the release. A competing emulator, PearPC been released the year before under the GNU General Public License, which allows commercial products to use the software for profit under "certain conditions, such as acknowledging previous work." Kryeziu stated PearPC had provided the inspiration for CherryOS, but "not the work, not the architecture. With their architecture I'd never get the speed I got." He argued that some similarities between CherryOS and PearPC were a result of "the fact that they were designed to perform similar functions," and that "there are some functionalities that can only be done a certain way, and names are going to be similar or identical." Wired senior editor Leander Kahney posited that if the final CherryOS release did contain PearPC code, PearPC would be unlikely to sue Maui X-Stream for "a cut of any profits since open-source codes are protected more by an honor system than any legal basis." By October 22, Kryeziu stated to Wired that he'd been contacted by Apple Computer for an undisclosed reason that "wasn't bad."

=== CherryOS 1.0 release ===
After a delay, CherryOS 1.0 was released in its final form on March 8, 2005. Maui-X Stream initially offered a free copy for evaluation on its website, with 14 boot allowances and five free days per copy. According to MXS president Jim Kartes, within the first few days the free version was downloaded 100,000 times. Stated Kartes to the Mac Observer on March 8, 2005, "there has been a lot of misinformation about this product... I think we have proven those skeptics wrong." Initial reports of certain computers encountering slow speeds and glitches were explained by MXS as "expected," as "it's got bugs. That is why we're offering a free trial download. If it doesn't work, they shouldn't buy it.... we will use the testing of consumers to improve its stability and performance." Kartes extrapolated that after development, somewhere between "60% and 70% of all PC owners" would be able to use the CherryOS product. MXS announced plans to market CherryOS throughout the summer of 2005, but withheld specifics on when it would be released for sale.

BetaNews.com reviewed CherryOS upon its public release, arguing that there were again similarities between CherryOS and PearPC, including specific non-generic lines of code. Maui X-Stream president Jim Kartes denied that CherryOS had grafted in PearPC code, and on March 24, 2005, a spokesperson for CherryOS stated to the Irish Times that CherryOS 1.0 was "absolutely not" a knockoff of Pear PC, as "there are considerable differences between the two products: Both products emulate the Apple operating system but the similarity ends there." The spokesperson further explained that "certain generic code strings and screen verbiage used in Pear PC are also used in CherryOS. They are not proprietary to the Pear PC product. For example, Pear tops out at G3 emulation and CherryOS is the only stable G4 emulator on the market today. CherryOS uses multithreading architecture for speed and ease of use. Pear employs a step-by-step approach; CherryOS features a shared-drive emulator, a drag-and-drop option allows you to connect the Windows drive to a Mac environment and CherryOS is the only emulator to support sound." Kartes further stated that although PearPC introduced their code before CherryOS, that "doesn't give them a claim on certain technical aspects of our product."

On March 30, 2005, Ars Technica reported that the creators of PearPC were "contemplating" litigation against Maui X-Stream. On April 6, 2005, Cherry OS was announced by its developers to be on hold "until further notice." A day later, CherryOS announced on its website that it would no longer be a commercial product, and that "due to overwhelming demand, Cherry open source project launches May 1, 2005." The trademark for CherryOS was filed as abandoned as of June 21, 2006.

== Technical features ==
=== Overview ===
CherryOS was a PowerPC G4 processor emulator for x86 Microsoft Windows platforms. Originally written to work with Windows 98, Windows 2000 or Windows XP, among other features Cherry OS purported to allow files to be dragged from PC to Mac, the creation of multiple profiles, support skins, and support for networking and sound. In October 2004, the program's developer announced CherryOS as having "full network capabilities" and "complete access to the host computer's hardware resources - hard drive, CPU, RAM, FireWire, USB, PCI, PCMCIA bus, Ethernet networking and modem." By October 21, 2004, the program was reported to be a 7 MB download with Velocity Engine included. At the time, MMX stated they were developing 3D acceleration for CherryOS.

The program was publicly released on March 8, 2005, with support for CD, DVD, USB, FireWire, and Ethernet. It was described as automatically detecting "hardware and network connections" and allowing "for the use of virtually any OS X-ready application," including Safari and Mail by Apple. Estimated to be compatible with approximately 70 percent of PCs, the CherryOS system required a Pentium 4 1.6 gigahertz (GHz) CPU or equivalent hardware and Windows XP, as well as 512 megabytes of memory and 3 gigabytes of hard drive space. After the initial March 8 release, speed of CherryOS 1.0 was reported to be variable. Karol McGuire of MXS stated that speed was depended on computer processor, as "a processor that has inadequate space on the hard drive or that runs at less than optimum operating speeds will not allow CherryOS to perform as designed." Following the public launch, the company announced that Kryeziu would be overseeing development on "sound support and network bridging, as well as improving speed." Kryeziu explained "we think we'll have the first two issues solved fairly soon. It's the type of product that will be continually updated as we go along. We think we can make it faster than it is right now, but this will take time."

=== Apple TOS ===
For its year in development, there was some question in the press as to the legality of CherryOS in relation to Apple's "Use and Restrictions" agreement, which only allows Apple programs to be used on a singular "Apple-labeled computer" at one time. The publication Ars Technica notes, however, that "a PPC emulator [like CherryOS or PearPC] isn't just for violating ToS agreements and bringing down the wrath of Apple Legal. It has legitimate uses too... you could use an emulator to run a PPC version of Linux on x86 hardware, and you could even use a P2P network to get that distribution of Linux, justifying two technologies with one rationalization." Despite this fact, the Irish Times pointed out that CherryOS was marketed exclusively to run Mac OSX, which it argued was "clear" violation of the OS X license agreement.

== Versions ==
Version	Debut	License	Notes
CherryOS Pre-release Version	October 18, 2004	Private beta	Released for private review only
CherryOS 1.0	March 8, 2005	Commercial	Released as full download and free partial download
CherryOS Open Source	May 1, 2005	Open-source	Announced on April 7, 2005

== See also ==
- List of computer simulation software
- List of emulators
- Comparison of platform virtualization software
