= William Kincaid =

William Kincaid may refer to:

- William Kincaid (artist), American costume designer and artist
- William Kincaid (flutist), American flutist and teacher
- William W. Kincaid, American entrepreneur and inventor
- Woody Kincaid (William Kincaid), American long-distance runner
- Bill Kincaid (William S. Kincaid), American computer engineer and entrepreneur
- Billy Kincaid, a character of the Spawn comic book series
- William Bradley Kincaid, American folk singer and radio entertainer
