= System Picker =

- Developer: Kevin Aitken
- Stable release: 1.0
- Operating system: Classic Mac OS
- Platform: Mac
- Type: Utility Software
- License: Freeware

System Picker is a freeware Classic Mac OS utility that allows the blessing of several System Folders. It was designed for System 6 and System 7, but is confirmed to work on Mac OS 8. It allows for multiple System Folders to be present on the same drive, working around the limitations of the Startup Disk control panel present in System 6 and 7.
