= Control Strip =

Macintosh user interface component

The Control Strip, pictured along the bottom left

The Control Strip is a user interface component introduced in the System 7 version of classic Mac OS.

== History ==
The Control Strip was initially released in 1994 with the PowerBook 500 series of notebook computers and the PowerBook Duo 280 subnotebook computers, at that point shipping with System 7.1 of classic Mac OS. Later on it was made available to desktop and portable Macintosh computers, beginning with System 7.5.3.

Apple removed Control Strip in 2001 as a consequence of its move to Mac OS X. Apple initially attempted to integrate the Control Strip’s features into the Dock. After this was found to be too clumsy, most of its features were again duplicated in the menu extras of 10.1.

An attempt was made at an open source reimplementation of the Control Strip for OS X, but it never received much developer traction and the last release is dated 27 October 2000.

The Control Strip name was revived for a similar feature on the Touch Bar, which served a similar purpose.

== Features ==
Somewhat like the system trays of other operating systems, the Control Strip allowed easy access to status information about and control of simple tasks such as screen resolution, AppleTalk activity, battery status etc. Each task appears as a button-like popup menu called a module, these modules are managed in the Finder as individual module files, which have their own folder in the System Folder ("Control Strip Modules") and are executed alongside the Control Strip as it starts up or can be dragged directly onto the strip while it is running.

The Control Strip always anchors itself to the closest vertical screen edge (left or right,) but can be freely moved up and down both sides of any display by the user. It defaults to the lower left corner of the primary display on fresh systems.

Users can choose whether to turn the Control Strip on and off and even set a hot key to hide and reveal it using its control panel. Two buttons at either end allow the Strip to be collapsed and expanded (with the one opposite the screen edge also allowing the strip to be resized when dragged), while two more buttons just inside those allow one to scroll through a very full Strip. Holding down the option key while clicking turns the cursor into a distinctive hand shape that allows one to drag the Strip around the screen, rearrange modules within the Strip and drag modules out.

Functionality similar to the control strip is present in Apple's Touch Bar, which first launched in October 2016. By default, the rightmost portion of the Touch Bar displays a subset of system controls previously available on the keyboard's function keys. When Control Strip is expanded the full set of system controls is displayed.

== Extensibility ==
Control Strip modules were also available from many third parties. For example, Conflict Catcher included a Control Strip module to switch extension sets, while DAVE used one to toggle SMB/NetBIOS networking. Some novelty modules even consisted of calculators, calendars and games. Like the System Trays of other OSs, this was often abused to insert a flotsam module that merely launched and quit a given application.
