= Jeff Robbin =

American computer engineer

- Born: September 8, 1969 (age 56)
- Occupation: Software engineer
- Employer: Apple, Inc.
- Known for: SoundJam MP iTunes

Jeffrey L. Robbin (born September 8, 1969) is an executive and software engineer at Apple, Inc. He developed the SoundJam music player software, which was acquired by Apple in 2000. There, he created iTunes, and was "closely involved" with the iPod's development. In 2011, Bloomberg reported that he was leading development of an Apple television set. As of 2018, he led the Apple Music engineering teams.

== Early life ==
Robbin was born in Port Chester, New York and raised in Highland Park, Illinois. His father, David, owned a residential real estate company, and his mother, Marilyn, was a first grade teacher. Robbin holds a BS in Computer Science from the University of Iowa and an MBA from the University of Illinois.

== Career ==
While pursuing an MBA, Robbin joined Apple in 1992. There, he worked on Copland, Apple's troubled operating system project, alongside fellow software engineer Bill Kincaid. Robbin and Kincaid both left Apple in early 1997; Kincaid joined a startup, while Robbin went on to create several Mac utilities which were distributed by Casady & Greene. One of these utilities was Conflict Catcher, a system extension for the classic Mac OS that could automatically detect and resolve conflicts between system extensions; these conflicts were one of the main causes of Mac OS system crashes.

=== SoundJam MP ===
In 1999, Robbin joined Kincaid and Dave Heller to start a small company, SoundStep, and develop SoundJam MP, a software jukebox that played MP3 files. The idea for SoundJam came from Kincaid's desire to make the Rio MP3 player compatible with the Mac. Robbin chose Casady & Greene as SoundJam's software distributor. David Pogue wrote the user manuals for SoundJam and Conflict Catcher, before he joined the New York Times.

SoundJam received positive reviews, and won the Best of Macworld award in 1999; it eventually secured 90% of the Mac MP3 software market. SoundJam competed with the Audion app, made by Panic. Both companies were vying to be acquired by Apple, but since Panic was already discussing a buyout with AOL, and since Robbin and Kincaid were ex-Apple employees, Apple chose to buy SoundJam in 2000. Apple hired Robbin, Kincaid and Heller, and used SoundJam's code as the foundation for iTunes.

=== iTunes and iPod ===
Shortly after the acquisition, Robbin was chosen by Steve Jobs to lead the iTunes development team, a position he still had a decade later. Jobs tasked Robbin with making the program easier to use to meet Apple's user experience goals; Robbin's team stripped the search box of its complex options, and adopted the brushed-metal look previously seen on iMovie. Less than four months later, in January 2001, iTunes was released for free as part of Apple's digital hub strategy, and was received with enthusiasm.

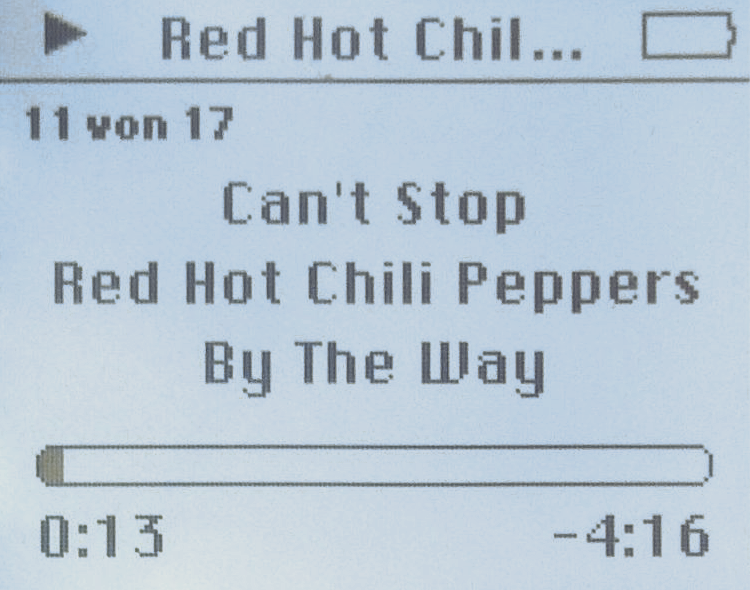
Robbin led the team that designed the iPod's user interface.

In 2001, Apple started work on the forthcoming iPod, with Tony Fadell in charge of the iPod's hardware, and Robbin's iTunes team responsible for the iPod's firmware and user interface, basing the firmware on software by Pixo. Robbin later told CNN that the process happened through "trial and error", with a continuous focus on simplification. Steve Jobs and Robbin were credited as inventors of the iPod's interface in a patent; the patent was initially denied due to prior art, but was later granted in 2012.

Jobs' 2011 biography names Robbin as one of the Apple executives who convinced Jobs to release iTunes on Windows; the port was released in 2003. One of Robbin's design goals was to ensure the Mac and Windows versions would be perfectly equivalent.

In 2004 and 2005, Apple collaborated with Motorola to create the ROKR E1 (also known as the "iTunes phone"). As the iTunes lead, Robbin worked closely with his Motorola counterparts, but was frustrated with Motorola's lack of cooperation, according to Fadell in a later interview. The phone was not commercially successful upon release.

In an October 2005 article, TIME magazine's Lev Grossman said that Steve Jobs had invited him to meet Robbin, but had prohibited him from printing Robbin's last name, because Jobs was worried about competitors "poaching his talent". On September 9, 2009, Robbin was one of the presenters at a music-focused Apple keynote, where he demoed the new features of iTunes 9, including iTunes LP.

=== Later projects ===
In 2011, Bloomberg reported that Robbin was in charge of Apple's effort to create a television set. Apple's plans to create a TV had been previously revealed in Steve Jobs's biography. The plans never came to fruition, and Apple abandoned the television project in 2014, after it was deemed to not be worth it.

In 2018, The Wall Street Journal reported that Jeff Robbin led the Apple Music product and engineering teams, having taken over after the music service's much-criticized 2015 launch.

In March 2023, Bloomberg News reported that starting in April, Robbin will take charge of Apple's cloud services, including iCloud, CloudKit, and the infrastructure that hosts iMessage and FaceTime.
