= INIT 1984 =

Computer virus

INIT 1984 is a computer virus that was set up to trigger on Macintosh computers running the classic Mac OS on any given Friday the 13th. The virus was first discovered and isolated in March, 1992. It functions by infecting startup (INIT) files and triggers when the computer is booted on a Friday the 13th. "Damage includes changing the names and attributes of a large number of folders and files to random strings and the deletion of approximately 2% of your files." The virus has a low threat assessment.
