= Bill Kincaid =

American computer engineer and entrepreneur

- Born: March 10, 1956 (age 70); Lima, Peru
- Occupations: computer engineer software developer
- Employer: Apple Inc.
- Known for: SoundJam MP iTunes
- Spouse: Dolores
- Children: Michael and Graciela

William S. Kincaid (born March 10, 1956) is an American computer engineer and entrepreneur notable for creating the MP3 player SoundJam MP with Jeff Robbin that was eventually bought by Apple and renamed iTunes.

== Work ==
Robbin and Kincaid worked for Apple in the 1990s as system software engineers on their operating system project Copland; the project was later abandoned. Both left Apple, where Robbin created Conflict Catcher and Kincaid worked at a startup.

After listening to a show on the radio channel NPR, Kincaid created hardware and device driver support for the Diamond Rio line of digital audio players. He then enlisted Jeff Robbin to develop the front-end for an MP3-playing software they named SoundJam MP. Dave Heller completed the core team. The three chose Casady & Greene as distributor, whom Jeff had previously worked with to distribute Conflict Catcher.

The software saw early success in the Mac music player market, competing with Panic's Audion.

In early 2000 Apple was looking to purchase an MP3 player and approached both Casady & Greene (SoundJam) and Panic (Audion). Because Panic was caught up in negotiations with AOL, the meeting never took place. Turning to Casady & Greene, Apple purchased the rights to the SoundJam software in a deal covered by a two-year secrecy clause.

SoundJam MP was renamed iTunes. Jeff, Bill, and Dave became the original developers of the software. All three continue to work at Apple, with Jeff as the current lead developer of iTunes.

In his spare time, he enjoys racing. In a racing profile, he says “A buddy and I wrote Apple's iTunes software and helped develop the iPod and the Apple music store. It wouldn't have happened if I hadn't heard about MP3 on the radio on the way to a race...”
