= Resorcerer =

Editing program for Macintosh computers

Resorcerer is a proprietary, paid resource editing program by Mathemaesthetics for the Macintosh operating systems. The most recent release was in 2001, when separate versions of Resorcerer 2.4.1 were released for Classic Mac OS and Carbon. The program was designed to have more features than ResEdit. Although no longer updated, it is still available for download.
