= Blue Meanies (Apple Computer) =

Former engineering group within Apple Computer

The Secret About Box debuted as an Easter egg in System 7.0, with the Blue Meanies credits.

The Blue Meanies of Apple Computer was an engineering group primarily responsible for the architecture of System 7 during the early and mid 1990s.

The name references the evil characters of Pepperland in the movie Yellow Submarine, and originated with the Pink and Blue split in Apple's operating system planning. Pink was the further-out project that ultimately became Taligent, and Blue designated incremental improvements to the flagship System 7. "Meanies" describes the group's architectural role, which frequently entailed instructing or negating engineers in other groups.

Though the Meanies have sometimes been characterized as the "coders of System 7", the OS was by then sufficiently large that major subsystems such as QuickDraw and QuickTime were developed and maintained by specialized groups, and the Meanies primarily focused on orchestrating the components together.

The name appeared outside of Apple as an Easter egg starting in System 7.0.1, where the texts "Help! Help! We're being held prisoner in a system software factory!" and "The Blue Meanies:" were followed by a list of names. Subsequent releases were updated to track the comings and goings of people in the group.

The nickname became well known, because many of the Meanies were also the senior engineers interacting with developers at venues such as the Worldwide Developers Conference (especially on the Stump the Experts panel) and MacHack. This included Darin Adler and Lew Cirne.
