= TeachText =

Text editor made by Apple Computer

- TeachText in System 4.2
- Operating system: Macintosh System 7.1 and previous
- Type: Text editor
- License: Proprietary

The TeachText application is a simple text editor made by Apple Computer and included with System 7.1 and earlier. It was created by Apple programmer Bryan Stearns with later versions created by Stearns and Francis Stanbach. TeachText was one of the only applications included with System 7, leading to its frequent role as the application to open "ReadMe" files. It was named "TeachText" as a nod to this role in tutorials and other introductory materials.

TeachText was derived from the Edit application, which was a simple text editor for the early pre-System 6 Apple Macintosh computers. Edit was included with early versions of the basic system software to demonstrate the use of the Macintosh user interface, and as the primary code editing tool for the original 68000 Macintosh Development System. While Edit was a tool and demonstration program for developers, TeachText was used mainly by users to display ReadMe documents.

Since the first Macintosh models came with a full-featured word processor, MacWrite, software publishers commonly shipped documentation in its native format. When Apple stopped bundling MacWrite, ownership was transferred to Claris, so developers could not distribute it on their programs' installation floppy disks. With no text program present on the disks, owners without a second floppy disk drive or hard disk could be left with no way to view documentation or installation instructions. Apple supplied TeachText as a small, freely distributable program to address this need.

TeachText could only operate on a single document at a time and supported only the default text font (12-point Geneva at the time) in the MacRoman encoding, with formatting such as bold, italic and underline. It also included rudimentary support for embedded images; the images were stored in PICT format in the file's resource fork in ascending numbers from zero, instances of non-breaking spaces in the text loaded up the appropriately numbered image, the first instance loading image "0", the second space loading image "1", and so on.

TeachText was automatically associated with all TEXT type codes for files with an unknown Creator code. That is, if a user attempted to open any text file and the original program that created it was not known on the local computer, TeachText would be asked to open the file in its place. In this respect, TeachText was the "default editor" of the Mac system, playing a role similar to Notepad under Microsoft Windows.

The underlying text engine was the TextEdit Manager built into Mac OS. TextEdit had originally been written to support very small runs of editable text, like those found in Save as... dialogs and similar roles. As such, it had been written with a short integer as a length counter, and could thus only handle up to 32 kB of text in a file. This conflicted with the "default editor" role when it was asked to open files longer than 32k, resulting in an error.

TeachText was later replaced by SimpleText, and with the arrival of Mac OS X, both were replaced in turn by the TextEdit application inherited from OPENSTEP.
