= Inside Macintosh =

Computer documentation

Inside Macintosh is the developer documentation published by Apple Computer, documenting the APIs and architecture of the Macintosh's classic Mac OS.

== History ==
The first Inside Macintosh documentation, for the first Macintosh, was distributed in two large binders with photocopied 3-hole punched pages. Every few months, updated sections were distributed for insertion into the binders. Some of the original sections were written by very early members of the Macintosh group, including Chris Espinosa and Joanna Hoffman. All of these volumes were designed to be read together, with no information repeated.

In July 1982, Caroline Rose was hired to take over the software documentation, while Bradley Hacker focused on documenting the hardware. In addition to being the lead writer, Rose edited Volumes I–III and was the project supervisor. In 1984, additional writers joined the effort, including Robert Anders, Mark Metzler, Kate Withey, Steve Chernicoff, Andy Averill, and Brent Davis.

Due to numerous last-minute software changes, the official version to be published by Addison-Wesley was delayed. In the meantime, a $25 Promotional Edition (known as the "phone book edition" because it was published by phone book publisher Lakeside Press) became available in April 1985.

Addison-Wesley published Volumes I–III in July 1985 in two formats: as three separate paperback books and as one hardcover book combining all three volumes. It is the official technical documentation for the original Macintosh, the Macintosh 512K ("Fat Mac"), and Macintosh XL.

Since Volume IV, authorship is attributed only to Apple Computer in general. Volume IV (October 1986) documents the changes to the system software in the Macintosh Plus, which was introduced in January 1986. Volume V (February 1988) documents the Macintosh II and Macintosh SE, which were introduced in 1987. It discusses Color QuickDraw, the Mac II and Mac SE hardware, and other new software components. Volume VI (April 1991) describes System 7. With 32 chapters, it is thicker than the first three volumes combined.

Shortly after Volume VI was published, Apple revamped the entire Inside Macintosh series, breaking it into volumes according to the functional area discussed, rather than specific machine models or capabilities. In this form, the series is far more coherent and a much better reference for programmers. As new functionality was added to the classic Mac OS, new volumes could be written without invalidating those published earlier—in contrast to the first series, which became increasingly obsolete over time.

In the late 1990s, Apple stopped publishing Inside Macintosh as a printed book, instead as a CD-ROM at least since 1994, and online. Since then, the CD variant has been phased out, though Apple developers still received online documentation as part of the developer CDs. In its online form, the information is much easier to maintain, but some developers still prefer a printed format.

Inside Macintosh covers only the classic Mac OS and a new set of documentation was introduced for Mac OS X. Initially this documentation includes only the Carbon Specification identifying the APIs in Carbon and the Cocoa documentation inherited from OpenStep. Later, the Carbon Specification was refactored into the Carbon Reference, which actually documents the APIs, taking much content from Inside Macintosh. The Carbon Reference and Cocoa Reference are bundled together in the ADC Reference Library.

== Reception ==
Reactions to Volumes I–III were mixed. Many praised the documentation for its clarity, thoroughness, and consistency, and others disagreed particularly about the lack of sample code.

In the January 27, 1986, issue of InfoWorld, columnist John C. Dvorak wrote that the highlight of the Appleworld Conference, for many, was Addison-Wesley's publication of Inside Macintosh. "It's $75 and worth every penny. It tells you everything you never wanted know about the Macintosh—a must for any developer." Also in 1986, Inside Macintosh Volumes I–III won an Award of Achievement in the Society for Technical Communication's Northern California competition. In 1988, software developer and columnist Stan Krute wrote, "If Pulitzers had a technical writing category, Inside Mac would win a prize. [Its writers] have given us the most comprehensive insight into a complex cybernetic system yet seen."

Bruce F. Webster in Byte of December 1985 described Inside Macintosh as "infamous, expensive, and obscure [but] for anyone wanting to do much with the Mac [...] the only real [printed] source of information." He quoted Kathe Spracklen, developer of Sargon, as saying that the book "consists of 25 chapters, each of which requires that you understand the other 24 before reading it". A Mac GUI article by Dog Cow quotes Robert C. Platt as saying, "The best guide to the Mac's ROMs is Inside Macintosh. Unfortunately, Inside Macintosh is also the most incomprehensible documentation ever written."
