= VMac =

Open source 68k Macintosh emulator

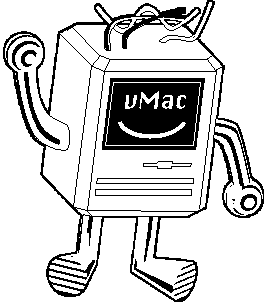

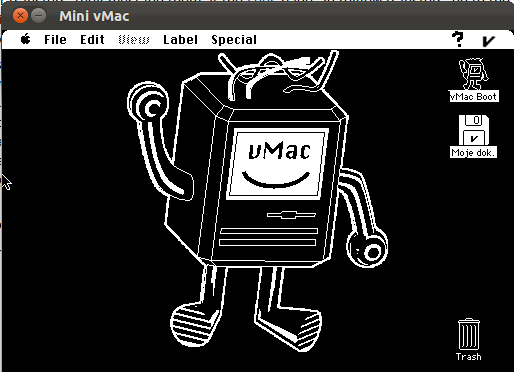
- Mini vMac running System Software 7 on Ubuntu
- Developers: Philip Cummins; Bill Huey; Weston Pawlowski (Windows); Yoav Shadmi (MS-DOS); Richard Bannister (Mac OS); Michael Hanni (Linux); David Bacher (OS/2); Paul C. Pratt (Mini vMac)
- Stable release: 0.1.9 (vMac), 36.04 (Mini vMac) / April 26, 1999; 27 years ago (vMac), October 28, 2018; 8 years ago (Mini vMac)
- Operating system: Windows, Linux, Classic Mac OS, NeXTSTEP, OS/2, MS-DOS, iOS, Nintendo DS, Android
- Type: Emulation
- License: GNU General Public License
- Website: www.vmac.org (vMac, outdated) www.gryphel.com/c/minivmac/ (Mini vMac)

vMac 0.1.9 running System 1.1 on System 7.5

vMac is a free and open-source Macintosh Plus emulator which is able to run versions of System 1.1 to 7.5.5. It is available for Windows, MS-DOS, OS/2, Mac OS, NeXTSTEP, Linux, Unix, and other platforms. Although vMac has been abandoned, Mini vMac, an improved spinoff of vMac, is still actively developed, although it also has not been updated since 2020.

vMac and Mini vMac support CPU emulation from Motorola 68000 to 68040, display output, sound, floppy disk insert, HFV image files, and more. Some vMac ports include extra features such as CD-ROM support, basic serial port (SCC) support, Gemulator ROM board support, and various performance improvements. Although the website is still in operation, most vMac development slowed to a halt in 1999, and no official releases have been made since. Many of the developer e-mail addresses listed on the website are not currently working.

== Overview ==
Mini vMac, vMac's spinoff, is still being maintained and developed by Paul C. Pratt. Currently Mini vMac supports Macintosh 128K, 512K, 512Ke, Plus, SE and Classic, with active development for Macintosh II, Macintosh Portable and PowerBook 100 support. Due to complaints about the rarity of the original II, it also accepts Macintosh IIx and Macintosh SE/30 ROM files.

vMac and Mini vMac require a Macintosh Plus ROM file and Macintosh system software to work. Macintosh ROM files are owned by Apple and cannot be legally distributed. However, the Windows and Unix ports of vMac (not Mini vMac) support the Gemulator ROM board from Emulators Inc., which allows users to add genuine MacPlus ROM chips to their x86 machine via an ISA expansion slot. This board can also support ROM chips from other early Macintosh systems, but the publicly released versions of vMac only supported the Macintosh Plus. Macintosh system software is available from Apple's Support Downloads website.

As mentioned, Mini vMac also requires a specific ROM image for the computer emulation desired. A software application for these 68000 Macs may be downloaded from the Mini vMac website for retrieval of a system's ROM image, along with a complete tutorial for locating an old Mac, retrieving the ROM and working with disk images.

== See also ==
- Basilisk II, an emulator of later 68k Macs.
- Executor (software), a emulator/compatibility layer for early 68k Macs.
- PearPC, an emulator of PowerPC Macs which can run Mac OS X and various open Unixes.
