= Macintosh Guide =

Help and documentation system from Apple

Macintosh Guide, with a coachmark shown

Macintosh Guide, also referred to as Apple Guide, was Apple Computer's help and documentation system, added to the classic Mac OS in System 7.5 and intended to work alongside Balloon Help.

== Functions ==
In addition to hypertext, indexing and searching of the text, Macintosh Guide also offered a system for teaching users how to accomplish tasks in an interactive manner. However, the process of creating guides was more complicated than non-interactive help and few developers took full advantage of its power. Apple enhanced the help system with HTML-based help in Mac OS 8.5 which worked in conjunction with Macintosh Guide providing links to Macintosh Guide sequences. Macintosh Guide was not carried over into Mac OS X, which uses an HTML-based help system.

Macintosh Guide made use of the AppleEvent Object Model (AEOM), allowing the system to examine the state of the application as it ran, and change the help in response. Help content was created in individual steps, and each step could have assigned to it conditions to determine if the step should be skipped, or if the step was needed. For instance, if the user had already completed several steps of an operation and needed help to complete it, Macintosh Guide could "see" where they were, and skip forward to the proper section of the documentation. Additionally AEOM allowed Macintosh Guide to drive the interface, completing tasks for the user if they clicked on the "Do it for me" buttons (or hypertext).

A distinctive feature of the system was support for Coaching. Using the AEOM, Macintosh Guide could find UI elements on the screen, and circle them using a "red marker" effect to draw the user's eye to it.

Macintosh Guide was also somewhat integrated with Balloon Help, optionally adding hypertext to balloons that would open the right portion of the documentation based on what object the user was currently pointing at with the mouse.
