= Basilisk II =

Open-source 68k Macintosh emulator

- Screenshot of Mac OS 8.1 running in Basilisk II
- Developers: Christian Bauer, Nigel Pearson (macOS port), Gwenole Beauchesne (JIT version)
- Release: 1999; 27 years ago
- Final release: 1.0 R5 / March 1, 2006; 20 years ago
- Operating system: Cross-platform
- Type: Emulator
- License: GNU General Public License
- Website: basilisk.cebix.net
- Repository: github.com/cebix/macemu

Basilisk II is an emulator that emulates Apple Macintosh computers based on the Motorola 68000 series. The software is cross-platform and can be used on a variety of operating systems.

Christian Bauer (developer of a Mac 68k emulator ShapeShifter for Amiga) released the first version of Basilisk II in March 1999. The emulator was expected to be highly portable across several computing platforms and provided some improvements in comparison to ShapeShifter - e.g. no limit for number of emulated disks, improved CD-ROM support and support for the host file system. Early reviews highlighted several issues like difficult configuration and limited compatibility with recommendation of ShapeShifter as a better choice for Amiga users. Newer releases mitigated these problems, 2005 review of the MorphOS version noted only slow CPU emulation (in comparison to built-in 68k CPU emulation for Amiga applications in MorphOS) as a major issue.

The latest version of Classic Mac OS that can be run within Basilisk II is Mac OS 8.1, the last 680x0-compatible version, released in January 1998. Mac OS 8.5, which came out nine months later, was PowerPC-only and marked the end of Apple's 680x0 support.

Ports of Basilisk II exist for multiple computing platforms, including AmigaOS 4, BeOS, Linux, Amiga, Windows NT, macOS, MorphOS, WebAssembly, and mobile devices such as the PlayStation Portable.

Released under the terms of the GNU General Public License, Basilisk II is free software, and its source code is available on GitHub.

== See also ==
History

- vMac
- SheepShaver
- PearPC
