= Thursby DAVE =

DAVE is a commercial-grade Microsoft Windows SMB/CIFS file and print-sharing functionality for Apple Macs developed by Thursby Software Systems.

DAVE was first introduced in 1996. At first, DAVE only supported Mac users accessing files on a Windows computer through a network. Thursby released a second version in 1998 which enabled Windows users to access files on Mac computers and to print documents from Mac PostScript printers. Microsoft DFS support was added in 2002.

Thursby co-wrote the Mac SMB/CIFS standards with Microsoft in 2002.

Although Mac OS X does have Samba support, the built-in SMB support with early OS X versions had limitations that DAVE attempted to overcome, offering better compatibility & performance for enterprise environments and specifically in networked use of Mac apps such as Final Cut Pro, Creative Suite, Avid and Office.

The ADmitMac and ADmitMac PKI products build on DAVE, adding enhanced support for Microsoft Active Directory and US government Public-key infrastructure systems.

In 2017, Thursby announced that DAVE and ADmitMac were now end-of-life products, writing:

Thursday, July 27, 2017 (Arlington, TX) – Today Thursby Software Systems, Inc. (Thursby) announced the end-of-life for both their legacy DAVE® and ADmitMac® products for the Apple Macintosh. DAVE was first introduced in 1996, 21 years ago, as the first Microsoft SMB file-sharing client on the Mac. In 2003, Thursby introduced ADmitMac as the first Active Directory solution for the Mac. Since that time, Apple has continued to improve their operating system by inclusion of their own SMB and Active Directory technology, in part with the help of Thursby. With the recent announcement of the High Sierra operating system, Thursby believes that Apple has finally culminated a total Microsoft file systems to the quality that eliminates the need for either DAVE or ADmitMac. Thursby will continue to support customers under contract, but does not expect any enhancements for the next operating system release. Legacy licenses with 30-day configuration support will continue to be available to all customers.

The final versions were DAVE v13 and ADmitMac v10.
