= Conflict Catcher =

Third-party Mac OS utility

- Conflict Catcher 9 running on Mac OS 9.
- Developer: Casady & Greene
- Stable release: 9.0.1 / 2002
- Operating system: Classic Mac OS
- Type: Utility
- License: Shareware
- Website: www.casadyg.com

Conflict Catcher is a discontinued utility software application that was written by Jeff Robbin and published by Casady & Greene for classic Mac OS. It aided Macintosh users in solving conflicts within Mac OS that could occur on startup when a large amount of extensions and control panels were installed (see Extension conflict). Later versions of Conflict Catcher included a playable Asteroids game as an easter egg in the About menu. Conflict Catcher included a printed manual written by David Pogue.

A Mac OS X version was never released, since the extension mechanisms in Mac OS X do not have extension conflicts. The last version of Conflict Catcher was version 9, for Mac OS 9. After declining sales, in 2003 Casady & Greene filed for bankruptcy. Conflict Catcher 9 was priced at $63, significantly higher than average prices for utility software.

== Reception ==
MacHome Journal called Conflict Catcher 8.0.1 everything you need for your system.
