= System Settings =

MacOS application

- System Settings application in macOS Sequoia
- Operating system: macOS
- Type: Control panel

System Settings (known as System Preferences prior to macOS Ventura) is an application in macOS that allows users to modify system settings, such as displays, audio, peripherals, and network connections. It was first introduced in Mac OS X 10.0 to replace the control panels found in Classic Mac OS, replacing multiple fragmented utilities with a single interface.

== History ==
=== Classic Mac OS ===
Before the release of Mac OS X in 2001, users modified system settings using control panels. Control panels, like the preference panes found in System Preferences, were separate resources (cdevs) that were accessed through the Apple menu's Control Panel.

A rudimentary form of system preferences dates back to 1983 with the Apple Lisa Preferences menu item. This included a subset of configurable settings called "convenience settings" as well as other settings that adapted according to the programs and devices installed on the Lisa Office System. The original control panels in the earliest versions of the classic Mac OS were all combined into one small Desk Accessory. Susan Kare designed the interface for the original control panel, and tried to make it as user-friendly as possible. This design was used until System 3 when separate control panel files ("cdev"s) were added, accessible solely through the control panel.

With the debut of System 7 the control panels were separated into individual small application-like processes accessible from the Finder, and by a sub-menu in the Apple menu provided by Apple Menu Options. Mac OS 9, the last release of the Mac OS before Mac OS X, included 32 control panels. By Mac OS 9, many control panels had been rewritten as true applications.

The control panels included with Mac OS 9 are:

- Appearance
- Apple Menu Options
- AppleTalk
- ColorSync
- Control Strip
- Date & Time
- DialAssist
- Energy Saver
- Extensions Manager
- File Exchange
- File Sharing
- File Synchronization
- General Controls
- Internet
- Keyboard
- Keychain Access
- Launcher
- Location Manager
- Memory
- Modem
- Monitors
- Mouse
- Multiple Users
- Numbers
- QuickTime Settings
- Remote Access
- Software Update
- Sound
- Speech
- Startup Disk
- TCP/IP
- Text
- Web Sharing

=== Mac OS X 10.0 ===
The System Preferences application was introduced with Mac OS X 10.0, replacing the fragmented control panels from classic Mac OS with preference panes within a single application. Preference panes are not applications but rather loadable bundles for the System Preferences application, similar to the arrangement used under System 6.

In 10.0, preference panes were organized alphabetically and up to six could be dragged into a customizable toolbar for quick access. A "Show All" button pinned to the top left of the toolbar allows users to return to the main list of preferences. Similarly to the Finder toolbar, the System Preferences toolbar could be hidden using the pill-shaped button on the top-right of the window.

=== Mac OS X 10.1 ===
In Mac OS X 10.1, preference panes were changed to be grouped into categories: "Personal", "Hardware", "Internet & Network", and "System", with a fifth category, "Other", appearing when third-party preference panes are installed. The tooltip telling the user that they can drag preference panes into the toolbar has been removed, and more than six items can now be added to the toolbar.

The "Desktop" item for configuring the desktop wallpaper, which was previously in the Finder settings, was moved to the "Personal" category.

=== Mac OS X Jaguar (10.2) ===
In Mac OS X Jaguar, the toolbar appearance was more customizable with new system-wide view options, with both a regular and compact size and the ability to show only labels, show only icons, or show both labels and icons at once. The ability to sort preferences alphabetically was re-added as an option.

- The "CDs & DVDs" item was added, which specifies the actions taken when various media types are inserted into the computer.
- The "Users" item was split into "My Account" and "Accounts".
- The "Universal Access" item was moved from the "Personal" category to "System".
- The "Login" item was renamed to "Login Items".
- The "Screen Saver" item was renamed to "Screen Effects".
- The "Keyboard" and "Mouse" items had their icons changed from depicting black peripherals to white.

=== Mac OS X Panther (10.3) ===
In Mac OS X Panther, the application icon was changed to feature a flatter and lower-contrast Apple logo, and the active preference item appears selected in the toolbar if present. The category backgrounds alternate between a darker gray and the previously-used background color, replacing the previous horizontal divider lines. Third-party preference panes can now be dragged into the System Preferences window to install them directly.

- The "Exposé" item was added for the corresponding feature introduced with the update.
- The "Security" item was added for the newly-added FileVault disk encryption program.
- The "Desktop" and "Screen Effects" items were merged into one "Desktop & Screen Saver" item.
- The "Keyboard" and "Mouse" items were merged into "Keyboard & Mouse".
- The "General" item was renamed to "Appearance".
- The "Internet" item was renamed to ".Mac".
- The "Network" icon was changed from a globe to a gray version of the ".Mac" icon.

=== Mac OS X Tiger (10.4) ===
In Mac OS X Tiger, the appearance of the window was overhauled using the new extended toolbar design introduced with the update. The customizable toolbar was replaced with Finder-styled back/forward buttons, a single "Show All" button to return to the preference grid, and a search field that highlights relevant items when a search is started. The ability to hide the toolbar with the pill button on the top-right of the window was removed.

- The "Spotlight" item was added for the corresponding feature introduced with the update.
- The "Exposé" item was updated to include Dashboard settings and renamed "Dashboard & Exposé".

=== Mac OS X Leopard (10.5) ===
In Mac OS X Leopard, the application icon was changed again to match its iOS counterpart with a skeuomorphic gear-based design. Many preference item icons were updated to reflect the new appearance introduced with the update.

- The "Time Machine" item was added for the corresponding feature introduced with the update.
- The "Parental Controls" item was added.
- The "Dashboard & Exposé" item was updated to include settings for Spaces and renamed "Exposé & Spaces".
- The ".Mac" item was renamed to "MobileMe" and its icon was updated, reflecting its rebrand.

=== Mac OS X Snow Leopard (10.6) ===
In Mac OS X Snow Leopard, the application was updated to be 64-bit. Launching a 32-bit preference pane restarts the application in 32-bit mode.

- The "Internet & Network" category was renamed to "Internet & Wireless".
- The "QuickTime" item was removed and replaced with a "Bluetooth" item.
- The "Keyboard & Mouse" items were split back into separate "Keyboard" and "Mouse" items, and a "Trackpad" item was added when using a laptop or external trackpad.
- The "International" item was renamed to "Language & Text".

=== OS X Lion (10.7) ===
In OS X Lion, individual preference panes can be hidden, but will still show in the View menu and search. Clicking and holding on the "Show All" button now opens a dropdown menu to quickly move between preference panes, similarly to the View menu. Additionally, items are no longer alphabetical within each category.

- The "Mail, Contacts & Calendars" item was added for managing Internet accounts.
- The "iCloud" item was added. However, the "MobileMe" item is still present.
- The "Exposé & Spaces" item was renamed to "Mission Control" to reflect the consolidated feature.
- The "Appearance" item was renamed to "General".
- The "Print & Fax" item was renamed to "Print & Scan".
- The "Security" item was renamed to "Security & Privacy".
- The "Accounts" item was renamed to "Users & Groups".
- The "Universal Access" item was moved back to the "Personal" category from "System".

=== OS X Mountain Lion (10.8) ===
In OS X Mountain Lion:

- The "Notifications" item was added for the newly-added Notification Center.
- The "Universal Access" item was renamed "Accessibility" and moved to the "System" category again.
- The "Speech" item was renamed "Dictation & Speech".
- The "MobileMe" item was removed.

=== OS X Mavericks (10.9) ===
In OS X Mavericks, the category labels were removed, although the categorization remains. Preference panes were also made 25% larger, increasing from 32x32pt to 40x40.

- The "App Store" item was added.
- The "Language & Text" item was renamed "Language & Region".
- The "Mail, Contact & Calendars" item was renamed "Internet Accounts".
- The "Print & Scan" item was renamed "Printers & Scanners".
- The "Software Update" item was removed.
- The "CDs & DVDs" item was removed.
- The "iCloud" icon was updated.

=== OS X Yosemite (10.10) ===
In OS X Yosemite, the application icon was changed to match the new design language, simplifying the gear design and removing the realistic shading. The individual preference icons were also updated. The title bar and toolbar were further consolidated, with the "Show All" button becoming an icon button, and the window title appearing aligned with the controls rather than on a separate strip above.

The "Extensions" item was added for managing system extensions.

=== OS X El Capitan (10.11) ===
In OS X El Capitan, the typeface was changed to from Helvetica to San Francisco, including within preference item icons.

=== macOS Sierra (10.12) ===
In macOS Sierra:

- The "Dictation & Speech" item was replaced with the new "Siri" item.
- The "Startup Disk" item was moved to the Hardware category.
- The "App Store" item was moved to the Internet & Wireless category.

=== macOS High Sierra (10.13) ===
In macOS High Sierra, the "Language & Region" icon was changed to a flag with a simplified globe icon.

=== macOS Mojave (10.14) ===
In macOS Mojave, dark mode support was added to System Preferences.

- The "Wallet & Apple Pay" item was added.
- The "Touch ID" item was added for supported devices.
- The "App Store" item was replaced with the return of the "Software Update" item from OS X Mountain Lion.

=== macOS Catalina (10.15) ===
In macOS Catalina, the organization of the application was overhauled. A section dedicated to the Apple ID of the logged in user was added at the top of the screen, the four single-line categories were replaced with two multi-line categories.

- The "Screen Time" item was added.
- The "Sidecar" item was added.
- The "Family Sharing" item was added to the new Apple ID section.
- The "iCloud" item was removed in favor of the new Apple ID section.

=== macOS Big Sur (11.0) ===
In macOS Big Sur, the design of the application was updated again to match the new neumorphic style. The application icon was updated to fit the new standardized squircle icon shape, and many preference item icons were redesigned. The window title is now left justified rather than centered, similarly to the Finder.

The "Energy Saver" item was also renamed to "Battery".

=== macOS Monterey (12.0) ===
In macOS Monterey:

- The "Passwords" item was added.
- The "Notifications" item was renamed "Notifications & Focus".
- The "Sidecar" item was removed.

=== macOS Ventura (13.0) and later ===
With macOS Ventura, Apple renamed System Preferences to System Settings and replaced the icon grid with a continuously scrolling sidebar and detail view. Apple described the redesign as making navigation more efficient and bringing the Mac interface closer to the Settings apps in iOS and iPadOS. Connected devices such as AirPods can appear as temporary top-level entries, while search remains available for locating individual controls.

The redesign substantially reorganized the preference panes rather than only changing their appearance. Settings that had previously appeared together were sometimes moved to different categories, and some controls were placed in modal dialogs or deeper navigation levels. Ars Technica described the change as the application's first major functional overhaul since the search field was added in Mac OS X Tiger, while criticizing inconsistent grouping and the loss of some conventional Mac interface behaviours.

Subsequent macOS releases retained the sidebar-based structure while continuing to reorganize individual categories and adopting each release's visual design changes.

== Preference Panes ==
In System Preferences, preferences are organized by theme into Preference Panes (abbreviated prefpane), which are special dynamically loaded plugins. Introduced in Mac OS X 10.0, the purpose of a Preference Pane is to allow the user to set preferences for a specific application or the system by means of a graphical user interface. Preference Panes are the macOS replacement for control panels in the classic Mac OS. Prior to Mac OS X v10.4, collections of Preference Panes featured a "Show All" button to show all the panes in the collection and a customizable toolbar to which frequently-used preference panes could be dragged. In Mac OS X 10.3 Panther, the currently-active pane would also be highlighted in the toolbar when it was selected. With Mac OS X 10.4 Tiger, the toolbar was removed in favor of a plain Show All button and back/forward history arrows. With the release of macOS Ventura, they were redesigned to look like the ones used in iOS.

== See also ==
- Settings (iOS)
