= System folder =

Classic Mac OS directory for system software

The System folder is the directory in the classic Mac OS that holds various files required for the system to operate, such as fonts, system extensions, control panels, and preferences.

System Folder location	macOS equivalent	Description
Extensions	/System/Library/Extensions /Library/Extensions	Classic Mac: Stores OS extensions (init format) macOS: Stores kernel extensions and drivers (kext format)
Startup Items	/System/Library/StartupItems /Library/StartupItems	Stores files or scripts to be executed at boot time.
Control Panels	/System/Library/PreferencePanes /Library/PreferencePanes	Classic Mac: Stores system configuration programs, which are loaded at boot time. macOS: Stores the various properties that appear in System Preferences.
Preferences	/Library/Preferences	Stores various application and system preferences.

Note: On macOS, files in /Library are not loaded at boot time when booting into Safe Mode.

== Location and "blessed" folders ==
The System Folder is normally located directly below the root directory in the filesystem hierarchy, but does not need to be. The Mac OS identifies the "System Folder" by undocumented characteristics that are independent of its name (it has different names in non-English versions of the Mac OS), or its location in the directory hierarchy. The Macintosh Finder displays this "blessed" folder with a special icon. A "live" System Folder can freely be moved to any location in the directory hierarchy while the OS is operating, and it will continue to operate with no problems after the folder has been moved and after the system is restarted with the folder in its new location.

When the Finder copies a "blessed" folder to a new volume, the copy is "blessed" as well. On a system with more than one disk volume, it is thus easy to create functioning backups of a system simply by dragging the folder. It is also easy to maintain older and newer versions of the OS "in parallel", each on its own volume, and revert to the old one if problems are encountered with the new one.

This degree of flexibility distinguishes the classic Mac OS from most other operating systems, including macOS.

All versions of Mac OS permit multiple copies of the operating system on a single volume. Mac OS 9 added formal support for this by permitting the user to select from multiple copies of the system on the same volume via the Startup Disk control panel, primarily used for selecting which volume to boot from.

Prior to this, one would have to manually bless the copy of the System Folder that they wished to use. A folder can be de-blessed by removing either the System or Finder files from it, which are the two files required for booting. (New World Macintoshes also need the Mac OS ROM file.) Some versions of the classic Mac OS, 8.5 and upwards, check the blessed System Folder before shutdown and warn the user if the System Folder is missing any of the key system files, to prevent them from inadvertently rendering the hard drive unbootable. An alternative to manually blessing the system folders in the Mac OS was to use a utility like System Picker.

Blessing is continued for mactel machines running macOS with an EFI system, albeit in a mostly different manner. See EFI system partition § macOS and the two types of booting for Apple's BootX bootloader.

== User accessibility and customization ==
The System Folder is less protected than the equivalent folders on macOS, in that the contents are all viewable and most files and folders are editable. However it was possible to prevent inexperienced users from accidentally altering the contents by using the Protect System Folder Contents checkbox in the General Controls Control Panel. The Startup and Shut Down programs, Appearance themes, control panels, fonts, and extensions, as well as items in the Apple Menu, are controlled by adding or removing items from folders in the System Folder.

This process was made more convenient when Apple implemented the Extensions Manager, itself a Control Panel that was originally a shareware utility by Ricardo Batista. This allowed activation and deactivation of Control Panels, Extensions, Startup Items and Shutdown Items, and could be invoked fairly early in the boot process by holding down the space bar on the keyboard.

One notable absence was the managements of Fonts. For this, Apple allowed Third-party development of font management programs such as Extensis Suitcase, Adobe Type Manager and AlSoft MasterJuggler.
