= Executor (software) =

Program used to emulate Motorola 68000-based Macintosh programs

- Executor's "browser" Interface
- Developer: Clifford Matthews
- Release: 1990
- Final release: 2.1
- Written in: C
- Operating system: Windows, Linux, Mac OS X (x86)
- Type: Emulation/Compatibility layer
- License: MIT license
- Repository: github.com/ctm/executor

Executor is a software application that allows Motorola 68000-based classic Mac OS programs to be run on various x86-based operating systems. Executor was created by ARDI (Abacus Research and Development, Inc.). Executor development was indefinitely postponed in 2005, and it was published as open source software in 2008.

== Overview ==
Executor was originally developed to run Mac programs on the NextStep platform and other MC680x0-based Unix systems like SunStation. During that time, two other similar products also existed for Unix systems: Liken from Xcelerated Systems Inc, and Equal from Quorum Inc.

Unlike true Macintosh emulators, Executor requires no startup ROM images or other Apple intellectual property. Executor, much like Wine for running Windows applications on Unix-like platforms, translates Macintosh Toolbox API calls and QuickDraw routines into equivalent Win32 or POSIX API calls. The MS-DOS version of Executor runs using the CWSDPMI protected mode DOS extender.

Executor translates 68k big-endian binary code into x86 little-endian binary code. Executor can only run Macintosh programs designed to run on 68000-based Macintosh hardware. Executor can mimic either Macintosh System 7.0.0, or System 6.0.7 for older applications that are incompatible with System 7.0.0.

Due to the GUI-oriented nature of classic Mac OS applications, Executor has its own GUI environment known as Browser. It mimics the classic Mac OS desktop and the Finder application without having features such as the trash can or Control Panels. The default Apple menu also does not exist in Browser but is replaced with a rough equivalent; running Mac applications will have Apple menu functions available. Executor does not have support for networking of any type, including AppleTalk support. Executor also lacks the ability to run components (such as extensions or control panels) that are highly integrated with classic Mac OS versions. Due to the differences between the actual MacOS ROM and the emulation provided by Executor, other compatibility issues exist. For example, heise Magazine reported issues with installation of many programs, and running early versions of StarWriter and Adobe PageMill. However, once installed, Microsoft Word, Excel and BBEdit Lite are usable.

The Unofficial Macintosh Emulation Pages reports successfully running Executor with 24MB of RAM on Windows 95.

After considering an open source release of the source code for some time, Matthews released the source code for the executor and syn68k applications on October 5, 2008, under a very permissive MIT-style license.
