= Audion (software) =

Audio player for macOS

- Developer: Panic
- Final release: 4.0.1 / January 11, 2021; 5 years ago
- Operating system: Mac OS X, Mac OS 9
- Type: Audio player
- Website: download.panic.com/audion/

Audion was a media player developed by Panic. It was originally a commercial (shareware) program, but with the dominance of Apple's iTunes, development was halted and it was released as freeware. It was retired on November 11, 2004.

In January 2021, an updated, stripped–down version was released for macOS 10.12.

== History ==
Cabel Sasser has written that he and Steven Frank had one goal with Audion: "We wanted to listen to our music CDs on our computers while we worked, and we wanted it to be stylish." During Audion's development, MP3 files became a popular means of listening to music on a computer, and Panic licensed an MP3 decoder for incorporation into Audion.

Audion was originally conceived as one piece in a set of small applications to be called PanicPack, but time constraints led to the release of Audion 1.0 as standalone application on August 16, 1999.

Audion became known for its MP3 decoder, which was reputed to produce sound with superior fidelity. Sasser said this was an accident, and that he and Frank have no idea how they achieved this.

Apple tried to meet with Cabel and Steven to hire them to create the original version of iTunes based on their work on Audion. The meeting never took place, and Apple instead acquired Audion rival SoundJam MP as the basis for iTunes.

Audion was retired on November 11, 2004. The final version was 3.0.2, released on August 22, 2002.

In March 2020, Panic announced they would be updating hundreds of Audion's unique "faces," or skins, to work with modern versions of macOS. On January 6, 2021, Panic released a stripped-down version of the player for macOS 10.12, with over 860 faces available.

== See also ==
- Comparison of audio player software
