= PearPC =

PowerPC emulator

- Developers: Sebastian Biallas, Stefan Weyergraf, Cassondra Foesch
- Initial release: May 10, 2004; 21 years ago
- Preview release: 0.6.0 / July 12, 2015; 10 years ago
- Written in: C++, C, Assembly
- Operating system: FreeBSD, Linux, Microsoft Windows
- Type: Emulator
- License: GNU General Public License
- Website: pearpc.sf.net
- Repository: github.com/sebastianbiallas/pearpc

PearPC is a PowerPC platform emulator capable of running many PowerPC operating systems, including pre-Intel versions of Mac OS X, Darwin, and Linux on x86 hardware. It is released under the GNU General Public License (GPL). It can be used on Windows, Linux, FreeBSD and other systems based on POSIX-X11. The first official release was made on May 10, 2004. The software was often used to run early versions of OS X on Windows XP computers.

== History ==
PearPC was released in May of 2004 by developers Sebastian Biallas and Stefan Weyergraf. Original releases were noted for being slow and unstable, but were still well received by the community. On July 6, 2004, Weyergraf was killed by a train, but development continued. The last current version of PearPC was 0.5.0, released on July 13, 2011. One of the reasons given for the development slowing down after 2005 was Apple's transition from PowerPC to x86 architecture.

== Features ==
PearPC only runs on x86 systems including Intel and AMD such as Windows, Linux, FreeBSD, and ReactOS. The emulator features a just-in-time (JIT) processor emulation core that dynamically translates PPC code into x86 code, caching the results. The original release emulated a G3 chip. The emulator shipped with the ability to run Mac OS X 10.3, OpenBSD for PowerPC, NetBSD for PowerPC, Darwin for PowerPC and Mandrake Linux 9.1, though it was noted that the emulated operating systems could be up to 40 times slower than the host. This speed was later brought up, running around 10 times slower than the host. It could run all the regular Mac applications such as Finder, Safari, QuickTime, and Terminal. The emulator can run Mac OS X versions 10.1 through 10.4 but cannot run 10.5 Leopard or above. Support for the G4 chip was later added.

== Shortcomings ==
The current official version of Pear PC is 0.5.0 (released on July 13, 2011). While its PowerPC emulation handles most applications, the project still lacks several components needed for a complete emulation of the PowerPC experience. Sound emulation, G5 chip emulation, .dmg support, and OS X Leopard support were not included in this release. The installation was sometimes noted as complicated, requiring editing of configuration files and the use of the command line.

== CherryOS controversy ==
A commercial PowerPC emulator called CherryOS was released soon after the launch of PearPC, in March 2005, claiming to offer more features and greater speed. Within hours of its announcement, however, questions were raised about the claims, with some people suggesting that Cherry OS was nothing more than a repackaging of PearPC. According to Cassondra Foesch, a principal author of PearPC, it still contained all or part of the code written for the PearPC Project. Cherry OS also created questions regarding the legality of commercial software developed and marketed specifically to run macOS on the x86 architecture, since Apple's license agreement specifically states that the operating system may only be installed on Apple-labeled computers. On April 6, 2005, the distribution of Cherry OS temporarily put on hold due to criticism. It was later released as open source on May 1, 2005.

== See also ==
- Comparison of platform virtualization software
- Hackintosh
