= System 7 =

1991 operating system version

System 7/Mac OS 7
- Version of the classic Mac OS operating system
- The Mac OS 7.6.1 desktop
- Developer: Apple Computer
- OS family: Macintosh
- Working state: Historic
- Source model: Closed source
- Initial release: May 13, 1991; 35 years ago
- Latest release: 7.6.1 / April 7, 1997; 29 years ago
- Supported platforms: Motorola 68k series, PowerPC (since 7.1.2)
- Kernel type: Monolithic (68k), nanokernel (PowerPC)
- License: Proprietary
- Preceded by: System 6
- Succeeded by: Mac OS 8
- Official website: Mac OS Releases at the Wayback Machine (archived April 12, 1997)
- Tagline: It's powerful, it's easy to use-it's the new operating system for your Macintosh.

Support status
- Historical, unsupported as of May 2001

System 7, later marketed as Mac OS 7, is the seventh major release of Apple Computer's classic Mac OS operating system for Macintosh computers. Released on May 13, 1991, it succeeded System 6 and introduced features including virtual memory, personal file sharing, QuickTime, TrueType fonts, the Force Quit dialog, and a revised user interface.

During development, the release was code-named "Big Bang." In 1995, Apple began using the Mac OS name and logo on the startup screen with System 7.5.1, in preparation for its Macintosh clone licensing program. The change distinguished Apple's operating system from the Macintosh hardware brand, which clone manufacturers marketed under their own names. Apple formally renamed the operating system Mac OS with version 7.6 in 1997.

System 7 remained Apple's operating system for nearly six years, longer than originally intended, as development of its planned successor, Copland, encountered repeated delays. Apple canceled Copland in 1996 and continued developing System 7 before releasing Mac OS 8 in 1997.

== Development ==
The Secret About Box debuted as an Easter egg in System 7.0, with the Blue Meanies credits.

By 1988, the Macintosh had been on the market for four years. Some aspects of the operating system were beginning to fall behind those of Microsoft Windows. Many of the assumptions of the System software architecture were obsolete – mainly, the single-tasking model, the replacement of which had first been examined in 1986's Switcher and then replaced with MultiFinder in System 5.

In March 1988, (Note: Project leaders Erich Ringewald and Mike Potel date the start of Pink as "March 1988" or "early 1988", but Apple Confidential 2.0 says "March 1987".) shortly before the release of System 6, a group of senior technical staff and managers at Apple held an offsite meeting to plan the future course of Mac OS development. Improvements that seemed achievable in the short term were written on blue index cards, longer-term goals like true multitasking on pink cards, and more ambitious ideas like an object-oriented file system on red cards. The blue and pink ideas proceeded in parallel teams. The Blue team nicknamed itself Blue Meanies, after characters in the film Yellow Submarine, and released System 7 in 1991. Pink was spun off into Taligent, Inc in 1992 within the AIM alliance with IBM.

== Overview ==
=== Changes ===
As intended with the Blue and Pink model, improvements in System 7 are significant but incremental.

- A new Sound Manager API, version 2.0, replaces the older ad hoc APIs. The new APIs provided significantly improved hardware abstraction and higher-quality playback.
- 32-bit QuickDraw, supporting so-called "true color" imaging, is standard; it was previously available as a system extension.
- System 7 allows a 32-bit program address space. This expanded the memory addressing capabilities from the previous 24-bit address space and increased the system memory limit from 8 MB to 4 GB.
- System 7 makes MultiFinder's cooperative multitasking mandatory.
- Trash became a normal directory allowing items to be preserved between reboots and disk eject events instead of being purged.
- System extensions are relocated to their own subfolder rather than in the root level of the System Folder as in System 6. They can be installed or removed simply by moving these "extensions" to or from the folder and then rebooting the computer.
- Similarly, the Control Panel desk accessory becomes the Control Panels folder. The control panels themselves are separate files stored within this directory.
- Under System 6, the Apple Menu contains both a list of desk accessories and a list of running programs under MultiFinder. In System 7 the list of active programs is relocated to its own Application Menu.
- System 7.1 introduces System Enablers, small extensions that are loaded at startup to support Macintosh models introduced since the last OS revision.
- Cannot run on Macintosh 512Ke.

=== New features ===
- Personal File Sharing – along with user interface improvements for AppleTalk, System 7 includes a basic file-sharing server allowing any machine to publish folders to the AppleTalk network.
- Aliases – small files that represent another object in the file system. Similar in concept to Unix symbolic links and Windows shortcuts, an alias in System 7 acts as a redirect to any object in the file system, such as a document, an application, a folder, a hard disk, a network share or removable medium or a printer.
- Drag and drop – document icons can be dragged with the mouse and "dropped" onto application icons to open in the targeted application. System 7.5's Drag Manager expanded the concept system-wide to include multiple data types such as text or audio data.
- Stationery, allowing users to save often-used document styles as a template. "Stationery-aware" applications create a new, untitled file containing the template data.
- Balloon Help, a widget-identification system similar to tooltips.
- AppleScript, a scripting language for automating tasks.
- AppleEvents, a new interprocess communication model for "high-level" events to be sent to applications including support for AppleEvents over an AppleTalk network.
- Publish and Subscribe permits information "published" by one application to be "subscribed" to in a document of another application, so that it is automatically updated if the original is changed.
- TrueType outline fonts, replacing bitmapped fonts and outline PostScript printer fonts. TrueType for the first time offers a single font format that scales to any size on screen and on paper.
- A newly colorized user interface, for machines that support color.

=== Installation ===
After initial publication on a set of 15 floppy disks, System 7 became the first Apple operating system to be released on a compact disc. Unlike earlier systems, System 7 did not come bundled with major software packages. Newly purchased Macintosh computers had System 7 installed and were often bundled with software such as HyperCard, At Ease and Mouse Practice. Later, the Macintosh Performa family added various software bundles including ClarisWorks, The New Grolier Multimedia Encyclopedia, Microsoft Bookshelf, Spectre VR and Power Pete. Since System 7 was introduced before the Internet came to popular usage, software such as MacTCP, FreePPP, and Netscape were not included. They later became available on disk from Internet service providers and bundled with books such as Adam C. Engst's Internet Starter Kit for Macintosh. Power Macintosh machines also included NuCalc, a graphing calculator. System 7 includes AppleTalk networking and file-sharing software in the form of system extensions and control panels.

The basic utilities installed by default with System 7 include TeachText (which was replaced by SimpleText in later versions) for basic text editing tasks and reading readme documents. Also available on the additional "Disk Tools" floppy disk are Disk First Aid for disk repair and Apple HD SC Setup for initializing and partitioning disks.

Later versions of System 7, specifically System 7.5 and Mac OS 7.6, come with dedicated "Utilities" and "Apple Extras" folders including: AppleScript, Disk Copy, QuickDraw GX Extras and QuickTime Movie Player. More optional extras and utilities can be manually installed from the System CD.

=== Transition to PowerPC ===
System 7.1.2 is the first version of the Macintosh System Software to support Apple's new PowerPC-based computers. 68k applications that had not yet been updated to run natively on these systems were emulated transparently (without the user having to intervene) by a built-in 68k processor emulator. Fat binaries, which contained the code necessary to run natively on both PowerPC and 68k systems, became common during this time. This process was similar to the distribution of universal binaries during the Mac transition to Intel processors in 2006, as well as the Mac transition to Apple silicon beginning in 2020.

System 7.1.2 is the only release of the Macintosh operating system that boots stating "Welcome to Power Macintosh." Release 7.1.2P reverts this.

=== PC compatibility ===
System 7.0 and 7.1 have a utility called Apple File Exchange, which accesses the contents of FAT- and Apple II-formatted floppy disks. Since System 7 Pro, PC Exchange is included, which allows the system to mount FAT-formatted floppy disks on the desktop like Macintosh disks. OS/2 disks can use the FAT file system. Macs can read and write UNIX file systems using extra software. System 7 accesses PC networks and uses TCP/IP and other compatible networking stacks.

=== Miscellaneous ===
System 7 had a larger memory footprint than System 6. System 6 could boot the system from a single 800k floppy disk and uses about 600 KB of RAM, whereas System 7 used well over one megabyte. It was some time before the average Mac shipped with enough RAM built-in for System 7 to be truly comfortable. System 7 was the first system release that could no longer be usefully run on floppy-only systems. Although most Macintosh models sold at the time included a hard disk as standard equipment, owners of older models were required to upgrade their hardware by buying either a new Mac or an external SCSI hard disk drive if they wished to run System 7.

The official system documentation, Inside Macintosh, initially shipped in three volumes, with another added to describe the changes introduced with the Mac Plus, and another for the Mac II and Mac SE.

System 7's virtual memory requires a Macintosh with a paged memory management unit (PMMU). The Motorola 68030 CPU has one, or one can be added to a 68020-equipped Macintosh II.

System 7.0 was adopted quite rapidly by Mac users and quickly became one of the base requirements for new software.

The engineering group within Apple responsible for System 7 came to be known as the "Blue Meanies", named after the blue index cards on which were written the features that could be implemented in a relatively short time as part of Apple's operating system strategy.

The pink index card features were handled by the Pink group, later becoming the ill-fated Taligent project.

System 7.0 is the last version of the Macintosh operating system that was available at no charge and could be freely redistributed. Although System 7 could be purchased from Apple, the cost was nominal and considered to only cover duplication and media. It was common for Macintosh dealers to allow customers to use the store's demo machines to copy System 7 install disks for the cost of a box of floppies. CD-ROM magazines such as Nautilus included System 7 on their disks. After Mac users downloaded thousands of copies of System 7 from online services such as AOL, CompuServe, and GEnie, Apple surveyed the services and based on this popularity started selling the Mac OS as a retail product with System 7.1. Apple continued charging for major operating system upgrades until the release of OS X Mavericks in 2013.

== Version history ==
Soon after the initial release of System 7, the 7.0.1 minor update was released in October 1991, which updated the Portable and Brightness control panels, added the Caps Lock extension – which showed an up-pointing arrow on screen if the Caps Lock key was depressed on PowerBooks – and added the Cache Switch control panel in addition to RAM disk and sound management optimizations for 68040 systems. Three small patches called "System 7 Tune-Up" also followed, which initially added the extension "System 7 Tuner" that improved memory management by quitting unused items, like applications and AppleTalk, and added "minimum" and "preferred" memory allotments to an application's "Get Info" box in its 1.0 version. This would be followed by version 1.1, which included LaserWriter driver version 7.1.1 and added a hidden extension called "Tuna Helper", intended to fix the "disappearing files" bug in which the system would lose files. The final release, 1.1.1, included everything 1.1 included but also added the StyleWriter 7.2.2 printer drivers, Chooser 7.1 and a minor update to Tuna Helper.

=== System 7.1 ===
In August 1992, the 7.1 update was released. This is the first version of the system software that Apple charged money for. Of this change, David Pogue wrote:

System 7.1 was remarkable for another reason, too: It was the first system software update Apple didn't give away. You had to buy it, much to the fury of user groups and online services that had gotten used to making each new system release available to everybody. Backing down in the face of the protests, Apple eventually offered the System 7.1 upgrade kit to user-group and online service members for less than $30. But the writing was on the wall: Apple was jealous of Microsoft, a system-software superstore to the world. Many wondered if the upgrade was even worth it. System 7.1 incorporated a huge number of changes, but the vast majority were deep-seated, core-level rewrites that added no usefulness to standard American Mac users.

— David Pogue, MacWorld Macintosh Secrets, 4th edition

New to 7.1 is the Fonts folder. This replaced the often time-consuming method of dragging fonts to and from the System file, introduced in System 7.0; it also replaced the Font/DA Mover application from System 6, which could also be used with 7.0. System 7.1 also included a lot of internal changes to support the internationalization of dates, times, and numbers. It was also the first version to support "Enablers", which removed the requirement to release a new version of the system software every time new hardware was released.

A set of specialized versions of 7.1, ranging from 7.1P1 to 7.1P6 (excluding 7.1P4) were created and included with various Performa models that were already available or were released after 7.1. These specialized versions included At Ease, Launcher, and some other changes that were integrated into later versions of the system software.

The first major upgrade was System 7.1.1, also known as "System 7 Pro". This release was a bundle of 7.1 with AppleScript tools, QuickTime and Apple Open Collaboration Environment (AOCE). While System 7 had some trouble running on slightly older machines due to its memory footprint, System 7 Pro barely fit into any Macintosh computers of the time. It was most commonly used for its minor bug fixes rather than its new functionality.

Apple co-founded the AIM alliance (Apple, IBM, and Motorola) in 1992, shortly after the release of System 7 in 1991, and started developing PowerPC-based machines that later became the Power Macintosh family. Support for these machines resulted in System 7.1.2.

System 7.1.2 was never offered for retail sale; it shipped with the first batches of the PowerPC Macs and a 68k version shipped with a small number of Quadra 600 series systems. Later shipments shipped with System 7.5 instead.

System 7.1.2P was the same as 7.1.2 and shipped with the Performa 630, LC 630, and Quadra 630 models that were released between July and November 1994.

=== System 7.5 ===
On September 12, 1994, System 7.5 was released with bug fixes from previous updates and several new features:

- An updated startup screen with a progress bar
- A new interactive help system called Apple Guide
- A clock in the menu bar (from the third-party freeware control panel SuperClock!)
- An Apple menu item called Stickies (formerly a third-party application called "PasteIt Notes"), which provided virtual Post-It Notes
- WindowShade, another former third-party shareware control panel, provided the ability to condense a window down to its title bar. It was introduced as a "minimize" feature to compete with Windows 95 as Mac OS had no taskbar or dock.
- MacTCP was bundled, enabling any Macintosh to connect to the Internet out of the box for the first time.
- The Control Strip (a fast way to change the system volume, control the playback of audio CDs, manage file sharing and printers, and change the monitor resolution and color depth) was enabled on desktop Macintosh models for the first time. It had previously only been included with the PowerBook series.
- A new Desktop Patterns control panel allowed for tiled patterns up to 128x128 pixels with 8-bit color; previous versions were limited to 8x8 pixel tiles with a maximum of eight possible colors. Similar functionality was found on earlier system versions exclusive to Performa models and was housed in the General Controls panel.
- The Extensions Manager (enabling the user to turn extensions and control panels on and off; also based on a formerly third-party control panel)
- PowerTalk, a system-level email handling service and the originator of the Keychain system.
- The Launcher, a control panel containing shortcut buttons for frequently used programs (in a manner akin to the macOS Dock)
- A hierarchical Apple menu (folders within the Apple Menu Items folder would expand into submenus showing their contents. Again, based on a third party control panel; HAM by Microseeds publishing)
- System-wide drag & drop for text and other data (selections can be simply dragged with the mouse and dropped to their new destination, bypassing the clipboard)
- A scriptable Finder
- QuickDraw GX, a 2-D graphics rendering and geometry engine
- For the PowerPC only, an advanced, 3d Graphing Calculator, secretly developed at Apple by a former third party contractor
- Support for OpenDoc

System 7.5 is codenamed "Capone", a reference to Al Capone and "Chicago", which is the codename for Microsoft's Windows 95 and is also the name of the default system font in Mac OS until version 8.

System 7.5.1 is primarily a bug fix of 7.5 but also introduced a new "Mac OS" startup screen in preparation for Mac clones.

System 7.5.2, released only for the first PCI-based Power Macs, introduced Apple's new networking architecture, Open Transport.

System 7.5.3 is a major bug-fix update that also included Open Transport for other PowerPC-based machines and some 68k-based machines. 7.5.3 improved the 68k emulator, and added translucent dragging to the Drag Manager. It included the first version of Control Strip to be compatible with all Macs. This was the first version of Mac OS to support SMP (9500/MP).

System 7.5.3 Revision 2 included performance enhancements; better reliability for PowerBooks using the third-party RAM Doubler program; improved reliability for PowerBook 500, 2300, and 5300 series computers with the PowerPC Upgrade Card; improved reliability when using the Startup Disk control panel; and improved reliability when copying files to 1 GB hard disks.

System 7.5.3 Revision 2.1 was shipped with the Performa 6400/180 and 6400/200; this particular release is specific to these machines as there was stability problems with System 7.5.3 Release 2 on the new hardware, especially with the video card and transferring files over LocalTalk.

System 7.5.4 was pulled due to a mistake at Apple, in which some components were not included in the installer.

System 7.5.5 included significant performance improvements for virtual memory and memory management on PowerPC-based Macs, including the elimination of one type 11 error. Also included are several reliability improvements, such as fixes for Macs using floppy disks equipped with a DOS compatibility card, improved hard disk access for PowerPC PowerBooks and Performa 5400 through 9500 computers, fixes for Macs that included an Apple TV Tuner or Macintosh TV Remote Control, improvements to LocalTalk and networking (especially for the Performa 5400 and 6400), fixes to system startup for the faster 180 MHz Macs (which included PowerPC 604 or 604e processors), improved reliability when using sound-intensive applications on Quadra or Centris computers that contained the PowerPC upgrade card, and improved stability when using multiple background applications and shared printers on a network. System 7.5.5 is also the last System 7 release that can run on 68000-based Macs such as the Macintosh Plus and Macs with ROMs that lack support for 32-bit addressing such as Macintosh IIcx. 7.6 and later required a 68030 processor and 32-bit-addressing-capable ROM and will automatically turn on 32-bit addressing on boot.

=== Mac OS 7.6 ===
Mac OS 7.6 (codenamed "Harmony") is the final major update, released in 1997. With 7.6, the operating system was officially called "Mac OS" instead of "System". New features include a revamped Extensions Manager, more native PowerPC code for Power Macs, more bundled Internet tools and utilities, and a more stable Finder with increased memory allocation. In this version, the PowerTalk feature added in 7.5 was removed due to poor application support, and support for a large number of older Macintosh models was dropped, including those with a Motorola 68000 or 68020.

Mac OS 7.6.1 ported the 68k exception handling routines to PowerPC, turning type 11 errors into less harmful errors (type 1, 2, or 3, usually) as crashing applications would more often terminate safely instead of crashing the operating system.

Through this period, Apple had been attempting to release a completely new "modern" operating system, named Copland. When the Copland project was abandoned in 1996, Apple announced plans to release an OS update every six months until Rhapsody (which would by 2001 evolve into what was released as Mac OS X) shipped. Two more releases were shipped, now officially branded as Mac OS: Mac OS 7.6 and the minor bug fix 7.6.1. Future versions were released as Mac OS 8–8.6 and Mac OS 9–9.2.

Released during a troubled time in Apple's history, 7.6 is known for several bugs, such as the inability to customize what components are installed to the system and its tendency to crash on some systems when they are shut down while a RAM disk is in use.

== Releases ==
Version number	Release date	Computer
7.0	May 13, 1991	
7.0.1	October 21, 1991	Macintosh Quadra 700/900/950; Macintosh Classic II; PowerBook 100; PowerBook 140; PowerBook 170 and some others
7.1	August 28, 1992	Macintosh IIvx; PowerBook 180; Macintosh IIvi
7.0.1P	September 14, 1992	Macintosh Performa 200; Macintosh Performa 400
7.1P	October 19, 1992	Macintosh Performa 600
7.1P2	April 12, 1993	Macintosh Performa 405; Macintosh Performa 430; Macintosh Performa 450
7.1P3	October 18, 1993	Macintosh Performa 410/460/475/550
7.1.1 (Pro)	October 21, 1993	
7.1.1	October 21, 1993	PowerBook Duo 250/270c PowerBook 520/540
7.1P5	December 1, 1993	Macintosh Performa 560
7.1P6	February 1, 1994	Macintosh Performa 575
7.1.2	March 14, 1994	Power Macintosh 6100; Power Macintosh 7100; Power Macintosh 8100
7.1.2P	July 18, 1994	Macintosh Performa 630
7.5	September 12, 1994	Macintosh LC 580
7.5.1	March 23, 1995	Power Macintosh 6200
7.5.2	June 19, 1995	Power Macintosh 9500
7.5.3	January 1, 1996	Power Macintosh 5400
7.5.3 Revision 2	May 1, 1996	
7.5.3 Revision 2.1	August 7, 1996	Performa 6400
7.5.3 Revision 2.2	August 7, 1996	Power Macintosh 9500/200; Performa 6360
7.5.5	September 27, 1996	Power Macintosh 5500
7.6	January 7, 1997	PowerBook 3400c
7.6.1	April 7, 1997	PowerBook 2400c Twentieth Anniversary Macintosh

== Timeline ==
Timeline of Mac operating systems

== See also ==
- List of Apple operating systems
- List of Macintosh software
- Inside Macintosh
- Mini vMac
- Project Star Trek

== Notes ==
Preceded by System 6	System 7/Mac OS 7; 1991	Succeeded by Mac OS 8
