= GatorBox =

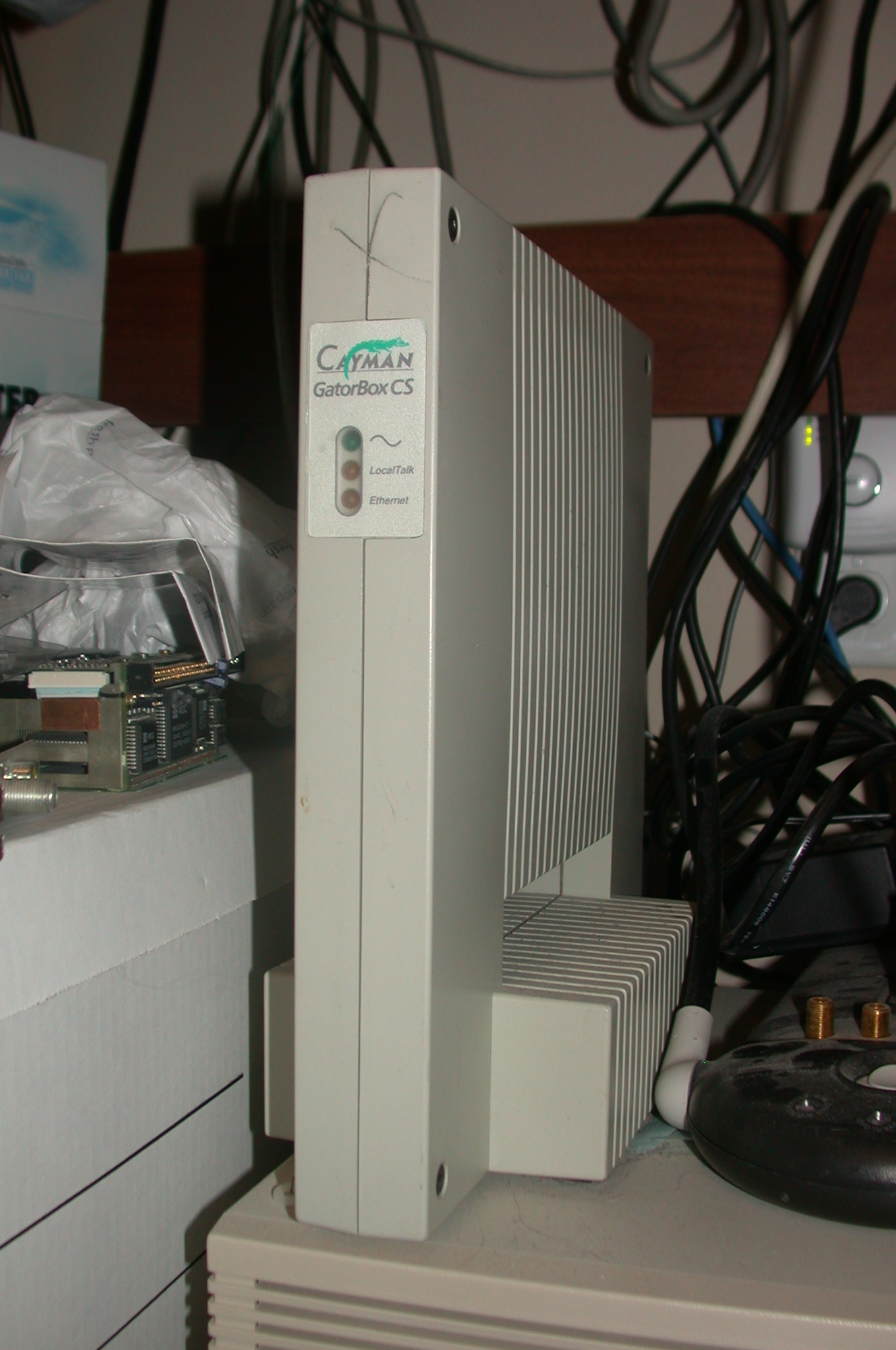
GatorBox CS

The GatorBox is a LocalTalk-to-Ethernet bridge, a router used on Macintosh-based networks to allow AppleTalk communications between clients on LocalTalk and Ethernet physical networks. The GatorSystem software also allowed TCP/IP and DECnet protocols to be carried to LocalTalk-equipped clients via tunneling, providing them with access to these normally Ethernet-only systems. The GatorBox was designed and manufactured by Cayman Systems, Inc.

When the GatorBox is running GatorPrint software, computers on the Ethernet network can send print jobs to printers on the LocalTalk network using the 'lpr' print spool command. When the GatorBox is running GatorShare software, computers on the LocalTalk network can access Network File System (NFS) hosts on Ethernet.

== Specifications ==
- The original GatorBox (model: 10100) is a desktop model that has a 10 MHz Motorola 68000 CPU, 1 MB RAM, 128 KB EPROM for boot program storage, 2 KB NVRAM for configuration storage, LocalTalk Mini-DIN-8 connector, Serial port Mini-DIN-8 connector, BNC connector, AUI connector, and is powered by an external power supply (16 VAC 1 A transformer that is connected by a 2.5 mm plug). This model requires a software download when it is powered on to be able to operate.
- The GatorBox CS (model: 10101) is a desktop model that uses an internal power supply (120/240 V, 1.0 A, 50–60 Hz).
- The GatorMIM CS is a media interface module that fits in a Cabletron Multi-Media Access Center (MMAC).
- The GatorBox CS/Rack (model: 10104) is a rack-mountable version of the GatorBox CS that uses an internal power supply (120/240 V, 1.0 A, 50–60 Hz).
- The GatorStar GXM integrates the GatorMIM CS with a 24 port LocalTalk repeater.
- The GatorStar GXR integrates the GatorBox CS/Rack with a 24 port LocalTalk repeater. This model does not have a BNC connector and the serial port is a female DE-9 connector.

All "CS" models have 2 MB of memory and can boot from images of the software that have been downloaded into the EPROM using the GatorInstaller application.

== Software ==
There are three disks in the GatorBox software package. Note that the content of the disks for an original GatorBox is different from that of the GatorBox CS models.

- Configuration - contains GatorKeeper, MacTCP folder and either GatorInstaller (for CS models) or GatorBox TFTP and GatorBox UDP-TFTP (for original GatorBox model)
- Application - contains GatorSystem, GatorPrint or GatorShare, which is the software that runs in the GatorBox. The application software for the GatorBox CS product family has a "CS" at the end of the filename. GatorPrint includes GatorSystem functionality. GatorShare includes GatorSystem and GatorPrint functionality.
- Network Applications - NCSA Telnet, UnStuffit

== Software Requirements ==
- The GatorKeeper 2.0 application requires Macintosh System 6.0.2 up to 7.5.1 and Finder version 6.1 (or later)
- MacTCP (not Open Transport)

== See also ==
- Kinetics FastPath
- Line Printer Daemon protocol – Print spooling
- LocalTalk-to-Ethernet bridge – Other LocalTalk-to-Ethernet bridges
- MacIP – A tunneling protocol carrying Internet Protocol in AppleTalk
