= Macintosh Office =

Apple's effort to bring Macintosh computers into business environments

The Macintosh Office was an effort by Apple Computer to design an office-wide computing environment consisting of Macintosh computers, a local area networking system, a file server, and a networked laser printer. Apple announced Macintosh Office in January 1985 with a poorly received sixty-second Super Bowl commercial dubbed Lemmings. In the end, the intended file server did not ship and the Office project would be cancelled. However, the AppleTalk networking system and LaserWriter printer would be hugely successful in launching the desktop publishing revolution.

== History ==
=== Previous efforts ===
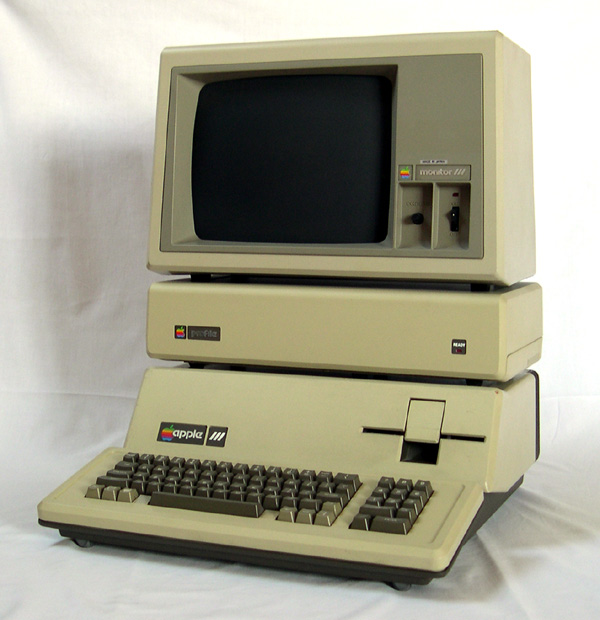
The Apple III

Macintosh Office was the company's third attempt to enter into the business environment as a serious competitor to IBM.

Following the success of the Apple II personal computer, Apple first sought to enter into the lucrative professional business market with the Apple III. A high-end computer with features geared toward the business professional, it suffered from many technical problems which plagued the system during most of its production run. As a result, Apple's reputation suffered and it lost any advantage it had entering into the business market – a full year prior to the introduction of the IBM PC.

Apple's second attempt was with the introduction of the revolutionary Lisa, a high-end computer aimed at the business community, based on the graphical user interface that was to become the basis of the Macintosh. Unfortunately it proved far too expensive and offered too few features for most businesses to justify the cost. A year later when the much less expensive Macintosh debuted, Lisa's fate was sealed. After being renamed the Macintosh XL in an effort to revive sales, a year later production ended following less than three years of poor sales.

While Apple had a hit with the Macintosh, they still needed a way to make inroads into the professional world and the Mac was already being criticized as a toy by the business community.

=== Strategy ===
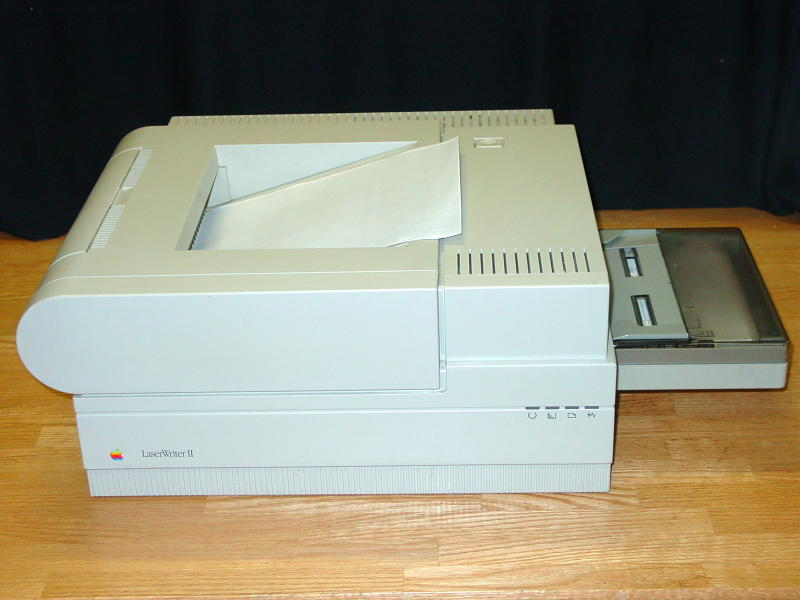
The LaserWriter II

Apple had initially examined local area networking through an effort known as AppleNet, which used Ethernet-like coax cable to support a 1 Mbit/s network of up to 128 Apple IIs, Apple IIIs and Apple Lisas. This was first announced at the National Computer Conference in Los Angeles in June 1983, but quietly dropped four months later. At the time, Apple commented that they "realized that it's not in the business to create a network system", and instead announced they would be waiting for IBM to release its Token Ring system in 1984.

This left Apple with no networking system until IBM released Token Ring. Internal work continued throughout, greatly aided by a series of memos from Bob Belleville, who outlined what the system would need to do and outlining the networking system, a networked laser printer, and a file server.

When the Macintosh had originally been designed it used the Zilog Z8530 serial driver chip, which had the capability of running simple networking protocols. The original aim was to produce a system known as AppleBus that would allow multiple devices to be plugged into a single port. The AppleBus concept had been dropped during development, but it left the systems with the hardware needed to support a local area network, all that was needed was the appropriate software. To address any short-term networking needs, Apple announced the development of a low-speed system running at 230 kbit/s. As the serial ports on the Macintosh were not connected in a ring, an external box (later known as LocalTalk) was used to provide "up" and "down" connections. The system was released in January 1985 as the "AppleTalk Personal Network".

Armed with the proper networking hardware, Apple set about developing the other key pieces of its business suite.

- It would include a dedicated file server they code-named Big Mac. Essentially it was conceived as a fast Unix-based server which ran the Mac OS as an interface shell.
- Also included was a networked hard drive intended to be plugged directly into the network.
- Finally, a laser printer which would produce typeset quality documents also shared among all the users on the network.

LocalTalk PhoneNet Connector

By January 1985 Apple was ready to launch the LocalTalk network which would allow a small office to inexpensively share its newly introduced LaserWriter printer. But the dedicated file server was up to two years away. The networked hard disk was closer, but still over a year away. By early 1985, Apple did not even offer a hard drive that worked on the Macintosh, much less a networked one. Unfortunately, Apple's newly announced network could do little else but print. As a stopgap measure, Apple had re-branded the Lisa 2/10 as the Macintosh XL and dropped the price substantially. With its built-in 10MB hard drive, greater RAM and Macintosh System emulation software MacWorks, the XL was positioned to act as the file server until Apple could develop the replacement. However, there was no file-sharing software to take advantage of the Macintosh XL. Nevertheless, based on the premise promised by the Macintosh Office, the Macintosh XL sold well at its reduced price, so well that Apple ran out of parts, forcing it to be discontinued long before the replacement network server was ready.

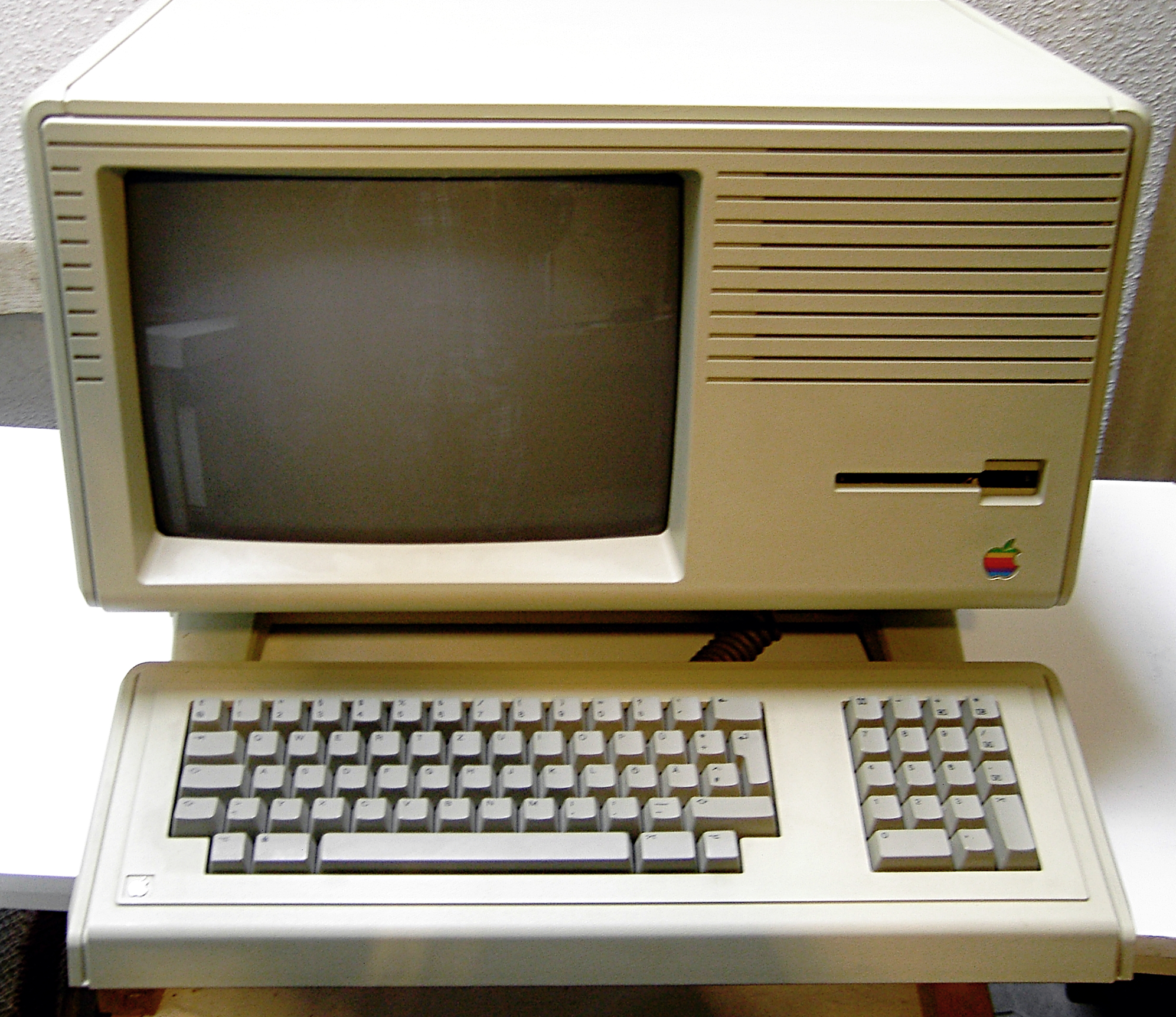
The Macintosh XL

In the meantime, third-party developers working with Apple, such as Infosphere and Centram Systems West (later Sun Microsystems) created AppleTalk-based file sharing applications called XL/Serve (later MacServe) and TOPS respectively. The former was actually a hard disk sharing application that allowed a remote client Mac to log onto a hard drive connected to the host Mac and work on a file. However, this arrangement meant that only one user could access the file volume at a time. Nevertheless, it fulfilled one of the main features of the Macintosh Office: a networked hard drive. By contrast, TOPS was a true file sharing application. With TOPS a remote client could log onto a host Mac and access and work on any file simultaneously with another remote or the host user. In addition, TOPS did not require a dedicated host, rather every Mac could be a host, offering peer-to-peer file sharing. What's more, TOPS was not limited to the Macintosh, but could also share files across platforms with IBM PCs. Both of these products, as well as others, helped fulfill Apple's announcement of the Macintosh Office.

Nevertheless, none of the software available represented a unified solution fully supported by Apple. Following the early removal of the Macintosh XL, Apple finally delivered its first hard drive for the Macintosh. Nine months after announcing it, the Hard Disk 20 was a mere 20MB hard drive. Though a welcome addition, it was slow and delivered none of the promise of a network file server. Though third-party products made good use of it, Apple would not offer another installment of the poorly implemented Macintosh Office for well over a year. Instead Apple canceled the UNIX-based Big Mac file-server concept and chose to focus on the next generation Macintosh II.

In January 1987, Apple finally introduced its file sharing application AppleShare. Together with a faster SCSI hard drive, the Hard Disk 20SC released 3 months earlier, Apple finally offered an officially supported unified, simple-to-use file sharing network. However, it failed to deliver on the promise of the initial announcement made 2 years earlier. At best, the Macintosh Office was a piecemeal solution run on relatively underpowered Macs, lacking many of the features offered by third-party applications before it. In fact, it would be almost 5 more years before AppleShare would offer peer-to-peer file sharing under System 7. It would take four more months for the release of expandable Macs that could accommodate the growing industry standard, Ethernet, and larger, faster built-in hard drives powerful enough to manage AppleTalk's potential to serve a large office. IBM network compatibility was still unavailable.

== Legacy ==
Though largely considered a failure by most, The Macintosh Office ushered in the era of Desktop Publishing with the advent of the LaserWriter, the low-cost network interface which made it affordable and the resulting software developers who took advantage of the Macintosh GUI and the printer's PostScript professional looking output. More than anything this cemented the Macintosh's reputation as a serious computer and its indispensable place in the office, particularly when compared to the capabilities of its DOS based counterparts.

== Timeline of Apple Inc. products ==
List of Apple products
See also: Timeline of the Apple II series and List of Mac models

Products on this timeline indicate introduction dates only and not necessarily discontinued dates, as new products begin on a contiguous product line.

== See also ==
- MacEnhancer
