= LocalTalk-to-Ethernet bridge =

A LocalTalk-to-Ethernet bridge is a network bridge that joins AppleTalk networks running on two different kinds of link – LocalTalk, the lower layers AppleTalk originally used, and Ethernet. This was an important class of products in the late 1980s and early 1990s, before Ethernet support became universal on the Mac lineup.

Some LocalTalk–Ethernet bridges carried only AppleTalk traffic, while others were also able to carry other protocols. LocalTalk only carried AppleTalk traffic directly, but MacIP was a protocol that tunneled Internet Protocol (IP) traffic in AppleTalk. A LocalTalk–Ethernet bridge supporting MacIP allowed e.g. any Macintosh without an Ethernet port to be part of an IP network, such as the Internet.

== Examples ==
Hardware devices:

- Asante: AsanteTalk
- Cayman Systems: GatorBox
- Compatible Systems: Ether Route/TCP, Ether Route II, RISC Router 3000E
- Dayna Communications: EtherPrint, EtherPrint Plus, EtherPrint-T, EtherPrint-T Plus
- Farallon: EtherPrint, EtherWave LocalTalk Adapter, InterRoute/5, StarRouter, EtherMac iPrint Adapter LT
- FOCUS Enhancements EtherLAN PRINT
- Hayes Inter-bridge
- Kinetics: FastPath - in later years, available from Shiva Networks
- Sonic Systems: microPrint, microBridge TCP/IP
- Transware: EtherWay
- Tribe Computer Works: TribeStar
- Webster Computer Corporation: MultiGate, MultiPort Gateway, MultiPort/LT

Software in MacTCP era (<1995):

- Apple IP Gateway from Apple Computer
- SuperBridge/TCP from Sonic Systems

Software in Open Transport era (>1995):

- Internet Gateway from Vicomsoft
- IPNetRouter from Sustainable Softworks
- LocalTalk Bridge from Apple Computer

Other Software

- macipgw
- Netatalk
