= FastPath =

Shiva Fastpath V5

The Kinetics FastPath was a LocalTalk-to-Ethernet bridge (now referred to as a router) created in 1985 to allow Apple Macintosh computers (which at the time only had LocalTalk network connections) to communicate with other computers on Ethernet networks. The product had five significant revisions (known as KFPS-1 through KFPS-5) during its lifetime and was ultimately sold to Shiva Corporation late in its existence. The original FastPath was developed to extend AppleTalk on Ethernet for Apple Computer, but from the beginning it was also modeled after an implementation of the Stanford Ethernet–AppleTalk Gateway (SEAGATE) created at Stanford University Medical Center by Bill Croft in 1984 and 1985. SEAGATE was a combination of hardware and software that picked up IP packets from the Ethernet network and encapsulated them inside of DDP packets on the AppleTalk network and conversely picked up specially-encoded DDP packets on the AppleTalk network and placed them on the Ethernet network as IP packets.

Although a few sites used the original SEAGATE multibus hardware as defined, it served as a proof-of-concept and was eclipsed by the Kinetics FastPath and similar hardware gateways by other companies. However, many university and research FastPath owners continued to be able to run the Stanford gateway software (later called KIP incorporating MacIP) inside the Kinetics FastPath. This is because KIP was an open source interface to the Kinetics hardware and local modifications and adaptations could be made.

By 1987, Apple had begun shipping Macintosh computers that were capable of having Ethernet connections directly, but the LocalTalk networking products prospered into the early 1990s, due to the popularity of Apple's plug-and-play networking and the continued existence of popular LocalTalk devices such as the LaserWriter.

== See also ==
- GatorBox
- LocalTalk-to-Ethernet bridge
- MacIP
