= TOPS (file server) =

File sharing system

TOPS (Transcendental OPerating System) is a peer-to-peer LAN-based file sharing system best known in its Macintosh implementation, but also available for DOS and able to interoperate with Unix's NFS. Originally written by Centram Systems West, the company was purchased by Sun Microsystems as part of Sun's development of the NFS ecosystem. The Centram company was renamed to TOPS after its acquisition by Sun. Sales of TOPS dried up after the introduction of System 7, which featured a similar file sharing system built-in, and Sun spun off their NFS developments for Mac to Sitka.

== Early versions ==
TOPS was implemented in the 1980s, an era where each computer system featured its own networking protocol and were generally unable to talk to each other. At the time Apple was in the midst of the Macintosh Office effort, and was working with two external companies to develop the Apple Filing Protocol (AFP), built on top of AppleTalk. The Macintosh Office effort ultimately failed, and one of the two companies, Centram, decided to implement a similar system on their own. This became the first version of TOPS.

When TOPS was originally released in July 1985 there was no peer-to-peer file sharing solution on the Mac. According to PC Magazine, connecting a Mac to an Apple LaserWriter printer was the initial intended function of AppleTalk. Apple's own file sharing solution, AppleShare, was not released until later, and unlike TOPS it required a dedicated server machine to run on, at least a Mac Plus. For smaller offices TOPS was an attractive low-cost solution, and saw relatively widespread use. Even after the introduction of AppleShare, TOPS managed to hold on to an estimated 600,000 client installs.

TOPS was initially a protocol using a custom set of remote procedure calls and able to talk only between TOPS clients. PCs generally lacked networking of any sort, and Centram addressed this problem by introducing a line of LocalTalk cards for the PC, along with a TOPS client. Files could be exchanged between the two computers, with filename conversion as required.

== FlashTalk ==
Centram later introduced the "FlashTalk" networking system that used external clocking to improve LocalTalk performance. The Zilog SCC powering the serial ports on the Mac used an internal 3.6864 MHz clock that could then be divided down to provide different standard bit rates. The fastest rate available internally was 230.4 kbit/s, used by LocalTalk. However, the system also allowed the clock to be read from a pin in the serial port, giving rise to the possibility of faster speeds with the right external equipment.

FlashTalk combined a conventional LocalTalk-like dongle with a clocking source and an external power supply. Using these connectors, and the associated software, TOPS could run at 770 kbit/s. This was not only a fairly dramatic improvement over LocalTalk, but also relatively speedy overall in an era when 1 Mbit/s networks were still common.

== TCP/IP Support ==
After the Sun purchase in April 1987, TOPS was given the problem of making a client that could also access Sun file shares using NFS. Centram solved this problem by porting their file sharing protocol to TCP/IP. This was not trivial; neither Mac OS nor Windows supported TCP/IP "out of the box", so what was now the TOPS Division of Sun had to write a complete IP stack for the Mac and Windows. Centram had already written such a stack for their "TOPS Terminal", a freeware (but not open source) Telnet terminal for the Mac.

Additionally, the majority of Macintosh systems used LocalTalk (or PhoneNet) for connectivity, and could not be directly connected to the Ethernet-based Unix LANs. They worked around this problem by supporting an emerging LocalTalk-to-Ethernet bridging standard known as "KIP", short for Kinetics Internet Protocol. KIP encapsulated TCP/IP packets inside AppleTalk packets, allowing them to be sent over existing LocalTalk connections. Dedicated KIP-supporting network bridges were available that stripped off the AppleTalk packaging, re-formed the IP packets inside, and sent them out over Ethernet.

One limitation of the TCP stack was that it did not support DNS, requiring users to type in IP addresses of the peers they wanted to communicate with. In a network of mostly Macs or Windows PCs this was not an issue, as DNS was not widely used with these systems at that time. KIP also reduced the need for DNS, as it allowed a Mac's existing Address Resolution Protocol (AARP) code within AppleTalk to look up the AppleTalk address of the remote peer, and then communicate with the TOPS stack on that machine to find the corresponding IP address.

TOPS also added the new "InBox Personal Connection" e-mail system, first developed by Symantec.

== Decline ==
TOPS' attractiveness was seriously eroded with the introduction of System 7 in 1991. TOPS had initially competed against the dedicated-server AppleShare, but System 7 included a file sharing server built-in, one that proved to be much faster than then-current versions of TOPS. TOPS sales dwindled and Sun spun off the division as Sitka, before closing it entirely in 1993.

== Reception ==
While noting its limitations and slow speed compared to PC-only networking, PC Magazine in 1988 said that TOPS "does an excellent job of Mac-to-PC integration".

== See also ==
- MacServe
- Macintosh Office
