= NCSA Telnet =

Telnet implementation

- Original author(s): Gaige Paulsen; Tim Krauskopf; Aaron Contorer
- Initial release: 1986; 39 years ago
- Final release: 2.3.08 (MS-DOS); 2.6 (Macintosh) / 1 February 1995; 30 years ago
- License: Public domain

NCSA Telnet is an implementation of the Telnet protocol developed at the National Center for Supercomputing Applications of the University of Illinois at Urbana-Champaign, first released in 1986 and continuously developed until 1995. The initial implementation ran under Mac OS and Microsoft MS-DOS, and provided basic DEC VT102 terminal emulation with support for multiple simultaneous connections and an FTP client. NCSA Telnet was the first implementation of telnet for the Macintosh or PC that provided the ability to connect to multiple hosts simultaneously.

Over time, the program evolved with added features and revisions to the user interface. Support for Tektronix 4010/4014 vector terminal emulation and a protocol for downloading and viewing raster images were added.

In 1987, a short-lived version for Sun Microsystems SunOS was released.

Although the MS-DOS version of NCSA Telnet lost popularity after Microsoft Windows became widespread, the Macintosh version remained in use throughout the 1990s as a basic connectivity tool in academic and commercial installations.

NCSA Telnet originally used a built-in TCP/IP protocol stack to communicate over the network. As standard APIs became available for network communication, the program was adapted to use them, most notably Apple's MacTCP. However, the built-in stack, one of the few completely independently developed TCP/IP stacks in use at the time, continued to ship in the software for years.

NCSA Telnet was released as free and open source software (although the term "open source" was not yet in use), and as such spawned a number of spin-off products including

- BetterTelnet
- Brown tn3270
- BYUTelnet
- InterCon's TCP/Connect series
- MacBlue Telnet (Chinese-language version)
- MacTelnet
- NCSA Telnet-J (Japanese-language version)
