= Kinetics Internet Protocol =

Kinetics Internet Protocol (KIP) is a network protocol used for the encapsulation and routing of AppleTalk data packets over IP. It also controls the routing tables.

It is defined in RFC 1742.

Apple Computer adopted the usage of KIP and refer to it as part of MacIP.

== Literature ==
- Sidhu, Andrews, Oppenheimer: Inside AppleTalk, 2nd, Addison-Wesley, 1999
- Apple Computer Inc.: Inside Macintosh: Networking, 2nd, Addison-Wesley, 1994, Chapter 1 - Introduction to AppleTalk (online version)
