= TWICS =

Two Way Information Communication System
- TWICS logo, circa 2001
- Founded: 1982; 44 years ago in Tokyo
- Founder: International Education Center
- Parent: PSINet (1998-2003); Inter.net Global Inc. (from 2003)

TWICS (Two Way Information Communication System) was a Japanese Internet service provider and online community. It was started in 1982 as a part of the non-profit International Education Center in Tokyo. Between 1982 and 1993, TWICS focused on their online community. Howard Rheingold wrote about their diverse international online community in his book, The Virtual Community. Joi Ito contributed ideas that led to the growth of the community, both as a teenager and later as president of PSINet Japan. Prior to TWICS offering public access Internet, Jeff Shapard led the company and developed the foundation for the community .

Until the mid-1990s, TWICS based their community on the Participate conferencing system running on a VAX computer from Digital Equipment Corporation.

In 1993 TWICS became the first organization in Japan to offer public access Internet services by leasing a line from a US-owned company called InterCon International KK (a subsidiary of TCP/IP software maker, InterCon Systems Corporation). After Jeff Shapard left TWICS, Tim Burress took over as president, leading the company through the complex regulatory process in Japan, and was chief engineer that led the project to successful connection to the public Internet. This achievement made them a target of intense rivalry from older more established companies who had already spent a year unsuccessfully trying to obtain licenses to provide similar services.

== TWICS and Linux in Japan ==
Starting from 1995, TWICS started to move their systems to HPUX under the technical leadership of Paul Gampe. Under Paul's leadership, TWICS also started to move edge systems to Linux. Paul later became VP of global engineering services and operations at Red Hat after leaving TWICS. Kevin Baker, another senior engineer at TWICS, worked at Red Hat as an engineering manager for 8 years. The Tokyo Linux Users Group (TLUG) was formed in the TWICS forum. Craig Oda, who was president of TWICS at the time was also president of the TLUG and co-authored an O'Reilly Japan book on Japanese support of Linux. Craig went on to become VP of product marketing and management at Turbolinux.

== Acquisition by PSINet ==
In 1998, PSINet acquired TWICS as part of their expansion into Japan. Rimnet was acquired at the same time. After the dot-com bubble popped, Cable & Wireless IDC acquired PSINet Japan along with TWICS in December 2001. .

In 2003, TWICS was taken over by Inter.net Global Inc.
