= AppleShare =

Former Apple product

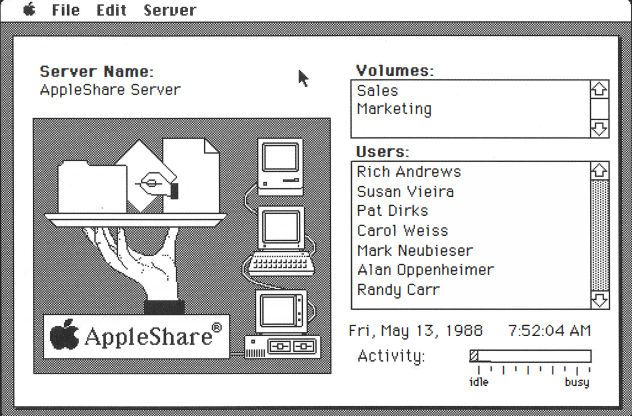
- AppleShare on Macintosh
- Developer: Apple Computer
- Successor: Mac OS X Server
- Type: Server for files, printing, web pages and mail
- License: Proprietary
- Website: apple.com/appleshareip at the Wayback Machine (archived 1999-05-08)

AppleShare is a discontinued product from Apple Computer which implements various network services. Its main purpose is to act as a file server, using the AFP protocol. Other network services implemented in later versions of AppleShare included a print server using the Printer Access Protocol (PAP), web server, electronic mail server, and SMB / CIFS server to support file sharing to Microsoft Windows clients.

Earlier versions of AppleShare supported only the AppleTalk network transport protocol but later versions, sold under the name AppleShare IP, allowed use of the TCP/IP protocol stack, as used on most modern networks. AppleShare provided three different protocols for application-layer services: AppleShare File Server, AppleShare Print Server and AppleShare PC.

AppleShare would operate with any physical network medium. Early installations used mainly LocalTalk (and more recently Ethernet), but any physical medium could be used which could be directly or indirectly connected to an AppleShare server system.

Equivalent third-party server products include the open-source Netatalk suite on Unix-like systems, and Services for Macintosh on Microsoft Windows NT and 2000. Versions of Mac OS from System 7 onwards included Personal File Sharing, which is a more limited AFP implementation. The most obvious difference between Personal File Sharing and AppleShare is that the former supports only a small number of concurrent remote users.

All versions of Mac OS were capable of acting as a client to an AppleShare server (via AFP and later SMB) over AppleTalk and TCP/IP protocols, although more recent versions of macOS have gradually removed support for AppleTalk in favor of TCP/IP. Third-party vendors created client software such as PC MACLAN (discontinued) and DAVE to implement client functionality on Windows systems. Other developers offered server software that provided similar functionality on Windows Servers such as GroupLogic ExtremeZ-IP, Cyan Software GmbH's MacServerIP, and NetATalk on Linux. Later versions of AppleShare also implemented the SMB and CIFS protocols which are the native file sharing protocols on Windows machines.

Apple discontinued the AppleShare product line following the release of macOS Server, which provides equivalent functionality.

== System requirements ==
AppleShare (IP) support from 3.0.1 for Macintosh.

Version	Release	System Software	Hardware
AppleShare 3.0.1	1/1/1992	System 7.0 or later. System 7.1 is recommended	Motorola 68000, 68020, or 68030
AppleShare 4.0.1	--	System 7.0.1 (with Tune-Up 1.1.1) through System 7.5.3; Classic AppleTalk only. System 7.1 is recommended.	Motorola 68040, except Quadra 660AV and Quadra 840AV
AppleShare 4.0.2	1994	Same as for AppleShare 4.0.1	Motorola 68040, except Quadra 660AV and Quadra 840AV; PowerPC clock speeds <=80 MHz except 6100/66 and 7100/80
AppleShare 4.1	1995	System 7.5.1 only	NuBus PowerPC
AppleShare 4.2.1	--	System 7.5.1 through Mac OS 7.6.	PowerPC 1995-04; OpenTransport Compatible; No 68k processor support
AppleShare IP 5.0	4/21/97	Mac OS 7.6, and Mac OS 7.6.1	PowerPC 601, 604, or 604e processor; not supported on PowerPC 603 or 603e
AppleShare IP 5.0.3	2/26/98	Mac OS 8.0 and Mac OS 8.1; Mac OS 8.1 is recommended	PowerPC 601, 604, 604e, or G3 processor; not supported on 603 or 603e
AppleShare IP 6.0, 6.1, 6.1.1	1998	Mac OS 8.1 with OpenDoc 1.2.1	PowerPC 601, 604, 604e, or G3; also supported on Power Macintosh 6500 series; not supported on 603, 603e or clones
AppleShare IP 6.2	1999	Mac OS 8.6 with OpenDoc 1.2.1	PowerPC 601, 604, 604e, or G3; also supported on 6500 series; not supported on 603, 603e or clones
AppleShare IP 6.3, 6.3.1, AppleShare IP Agent Update 6.3.2, AppleShare IP 9.0.4 Update	--	Mac OS 9.0; 9.0.3 or 9.0.4 with 6.3.1; OpenDoc not required	PowerPC 601, 604, 604e, G3, or single G4; also supported on 6500 series; not supported on 603, 603e or clones
AppleShare IP 6.3.3	--	Mac OS 9.1 (OpenDoc not required)	Released prior to 2001-07-18 with PowerPC 601, 604, 604e, G3, or G4(s); also supported on 6500 series; not supported on 603, 603e or clones
AppleShare IP 6.3.3 v1.2	--	Mac OS 9.2.1 or 9.2.2	Macintosh Server G4 (QuickSilver)
AppleShare IP 6.3.3 v1.3	--	Mac OS 9.2.2	Macintosh Server G4 (QuickSilver 2002)

== See also ==
- Disk sharing

== Bibliography ==
- Crabb, Don (20 April 1987). "Apple LAN Server Is Speedy, Easy to Configure and Control". InfoWorld. pp. 62–64.
