= .dss =

.dss is a filename extension. It may refer to:

- (most likely) a Digital Speech Standard file
- The existence of .DSS files on storage mediums may also be the result of automatic lossy file name conversion of .DS_Store files to e.g. the old FAT 8.3 character file name restrictions
