= Intercon =

Intercon may refer to:

- Intercon LARP conventions, a series of live action role-playing game conventions
- InterCon Systems Corporation, a TCP/IP software manufacturer
