= MacEnhancer =

Expansion box for the Compact Macintosh

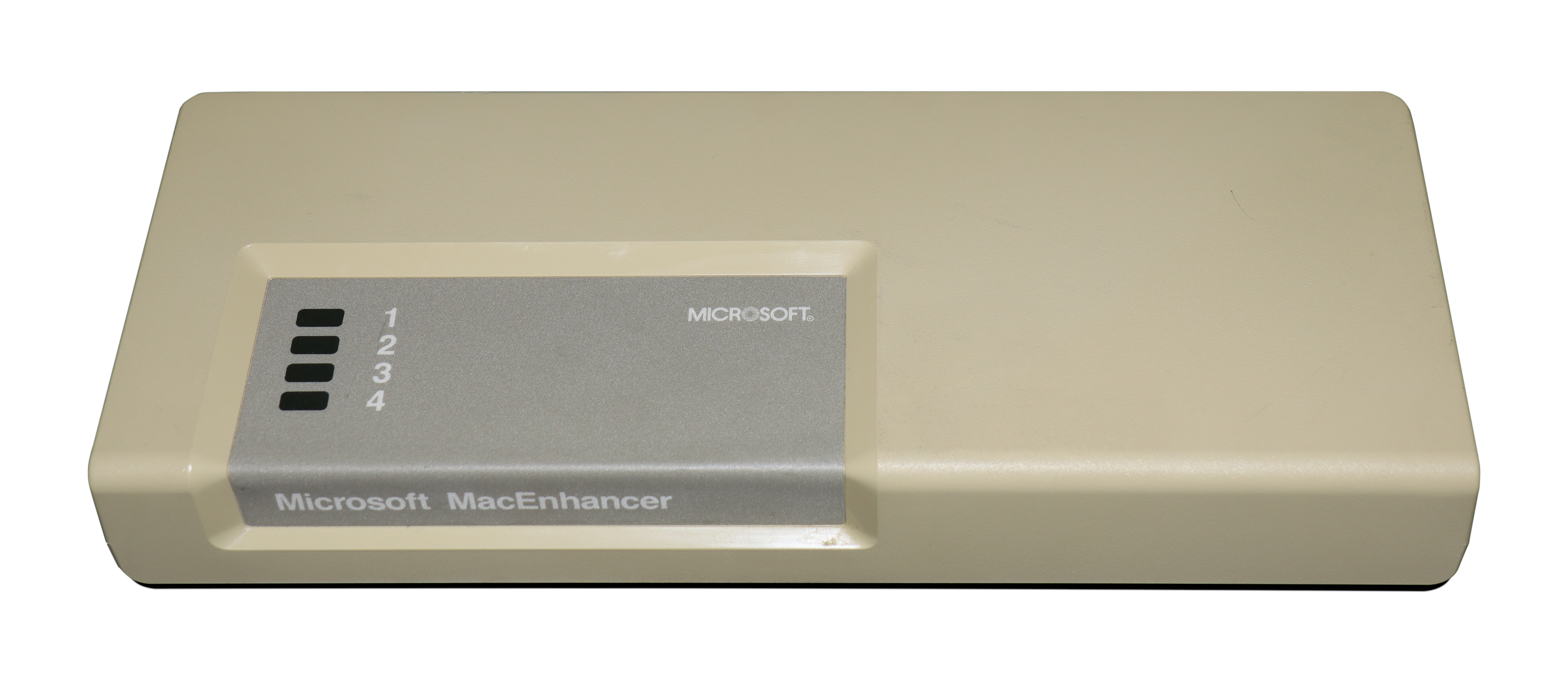
- Manufacturer: Microsoft (1985–1986); SoftStyle (1986–1988)
- Introduced: January 22, 1985; 40 years ago
- Discontinued: 1988; 37 years ago
- Cost: US$245
- Type: Expansion box

The MacEnhancer is an expansion box originally developed in 1985 by Microsoft for Apple Computer's original Macintosh. Plugged into either the Macintosh's serial printer or modem ports, the MacEnhancer provides IBM-standard printer and serial ports as well as a passthrough for the Mac-standard serial port, for a net gain of three peripheral ports. Along with a provided disk of drivers, this expansion box allows the Macintosh to run a host of printers and other business peripherals not originally supported by Apple.

== Background ==
Microsoft began producing hardware for Apple with the Z-80 SoftCard, an Apple II processor card, in 1980. The SoftCard also served as Microsoft's first ever hardware product.

When Apple introduced the first Macintosh in 1984, the only printer it supported was Apple's own ImageWriter, which connects to the Macintosh through a serial interface—the only type of connection this Macintosh offers. This dearth in choices for printers led the Macintosh to flounder in the business world, where the IBM PC, and the Apple II before it, achieved widespread adoption owing to their parallel ports, which support a wide variety of printers and other peripherals. To rectify this, on January 22, 1985, Microsoft announced the MacEnhancer, an expansion box for the original Macintosh (retronymically dubbed the Macintosh 128K) and the recently released Macintosh 512K. Microsoft's announcement came on the eve of Apple announcing their Macintosh Office initiative to develop more hardware to make the Macintosh attractive to corporate buyers, an initiative which bore the seminal LaserWriter printer.

== Specifications ==
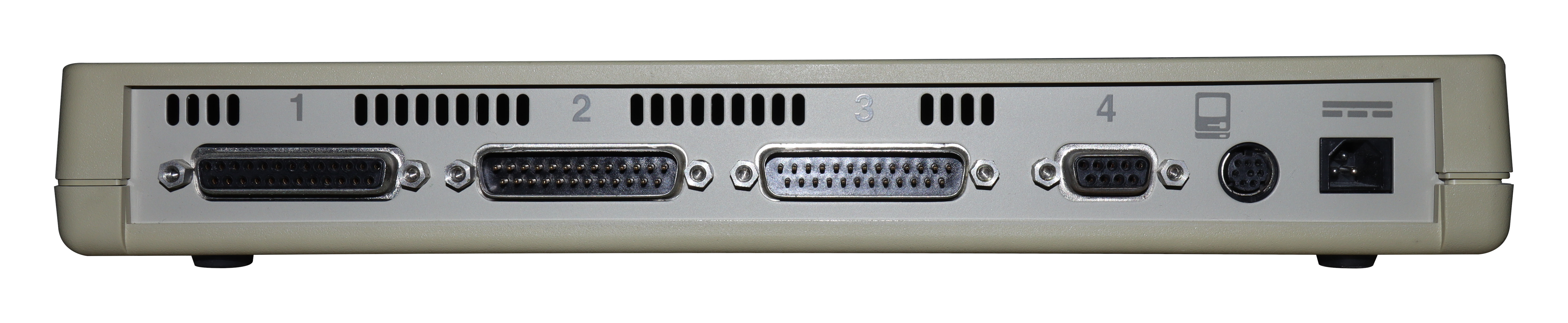
The rear ports of a MacEnhancer; from left to right, one DB-25 parallel port, two DB-25 serial ports, one DE-9 RS-422 port, an 8-pin mini-DIN (for connecting to the Macintosh), and the DC power jack

The MacEnhancer is an expansion box less than 12 inches (30 cm) wide, 4 inches (10 cm) deep, and 1 inch (2.5 cm) high. It connects to the Macintosh via a cable with an 8-pin mini-DIN connector to the MacEnhancer side and a DE-9 connector on the Macintosh side, to either the Macintosh's RS-422 printer or modem connectors. The MacEnhancer has four ports—one Macintosh-standard DE-9 connector (as a passthrough for the occupied modem or printer connector), two IBM-standard DB-25 RS-232 serial ports, and one IBM-standard DB-25 parallel port. Accompanying floppy disks with the MacEnhancer provide the user with a utility used to control the MacEnhancer, device drivers for numerous contemporary printers, and MacTerminal—a terminal emulator. While the MacEnhancer allows multiple devices to be connected to it, it does not support output to more than one port at a time. The included MacEnhancer software utility allows the user to switch the active port.

== Release and reception ==
The MacEnhancer retailed for US$245 (equivalent to $716 in 2024). Microsoft sold out of its initial production run of 4,000 units in April 1985, contracting the manufacture of another 2,000 units that month. On the release of the Macintosh Plus in 1986, the company had to revise the MacEnhancer slightly to account for a missing power rail on one of its rear serial connectors.

David Ushijima of Macworld gave the MacEnhancer a positive review, calling the included software easy to use and the hardware reliable and broadly supportive as advertised. While he recognized the benefit of having support for different types of printers for different applications (e.g. lower-fidelity dot-matrix printers for graphical work and letter-quality printers for business correspondence), he ultimately dubbed the MacEnhancer an "expensive alternative to plugging and unplugging cables" and only saw real value in the added IBM-standard parallel printer port.

Microsoft left the Macintosh hardware market in 1986, selling the hardware and software rights for the MacEnhancer to SoftStyle, a software development company based in Hawaii Kai, Hawaii, that specialized in device drivers. SoftStyle issued another version of the MacEnhancer in late 1986. The box largely remained the same but changed the 9-pin DB passthrough connector to an 8-pin mini-DIN connector—a style of connector that had become standard for Macintosh peripherals with the release of the Plus. (Note: A 9-pin-DB-cable-to-8-pin mini-DIN adapter cable was included for connecting older Macintosh printers.) The software also added support for controlling two MacEnhancers plugged into the same Macintosh, effectively giving the Macintosh eight peripheral ports. SoftStyle's MacEnhancer dropped support for the Macintosh 128K because of its requirement for versions of Finder that support HFS (version 5.3 onward).

SoftStyle was acquired by Phoenix Technologies in 1988; the latter terminated all of SoftStyle's Macintosh hardware products after the acquisition. Several ex-programmers for SoftStyle formed Momentum, Inc., in Honolulu, Hawaii. This company marketed the Momentum Port Juggler, which like the MacEnhancer offered several serial ports for Macintosh products. The company fizzled in the late 1990s, after Apple announced that they had ditched mini-DIN serial cables with the Power Macintosh G3 in 1997. Looking retrospectively, Benj Edwards of PC Magazine called the MacEnhancer a "very useful expansion peripheral" and a "lost" hardware product of Microsoft.
