= AppleTalk =

Computer networking protocol suite

- Protocol stack
- Developer: Apple Computer
- Introduction: 1985; 41 years ago
- Hardware: LocalTalk, others

AppleTalk is a discontinued proprietary suite of networking protocols developed by Apple Computer for their Macintosh computers. AppleTalk includes a number of features that allow local area networks to be connected with no prior setup or the need for a centralized router or server of any sort. Connected AppleTalk-equipped systems automatically assign addresses, update the distributed namespace, and configure any required inter-networking routing.

AppleTalk was released in 1985 and was the primary protocol used by Apple devices through the 1980s and 1990s. Versions were also released for the IBM PC and compatibles and the Apple IIGS. AppleTalk support was also available in most networked printers (especially laser printers), some file servers, and a number of routers.

The rise of TCP/IP during the 1990s led to a reimplementation of most of these types of support on that protocol, and AppleTalk became unsupported as of the release of Mac OS X Snow Leopard in 2009. Many of AppleTalk's more advanced autoconfiguration features have since been introduced in Bonjour, while Universal Plug and Play serves similar needs.

== History ==
=== AppleNet ===
After the release of the Apple Lisa computer in January 1983, Apple invested considerable effort in the development of a local area networking (LAN) system for the machines. Known as AppleNet, it was based on the seminal Xerox XNS protocol stack but running on a custom 1 Mbit/s coaxial cable system rather than Xerox's 2.94 Mbit/s Ethernet. AppleNet was announced early in 1983 with a full introduction at the target price of $500 for plug-in AppleNet cards for the Lisa and the Apple II.

At that time, early LAN systems were just coming to market, including Ethernet, Token Ring, and ARCNET. This was a topic of major commercial effort at the time, dominating shows like the National Computer Conference (NCC) in Anaheim in May 1983. All of the systems were jockeying for position in the market, but even at this time, Ethernet's widespread acceptance suggested it was to become a de facto standard. It was at this show that Steve Jobs asked Gursharan Sidhu a seemingly innocuous question: "Why has networking not caught on?"

Four months later, in October, AppleNet was cancelled. At the time, they announced that "Apple realized that it's not in the business to create a networking system. We built and used AppleNet in-house, but we realized that if we had shipped it, we would have seen new standards coming up." In January, Jobs announced that they would instead be supporting IBM's Token Ring, which he expected to come out in a "few months".

=== AppleBus ===
Through this period, Apple was deep in development of the Macintosh computer. During development, engineers had made the decision to use the Zilog 8530 serial controller chip (SCC) instead of the lower-cost and more common UART to provide serial port connections. The SCC cost about $5 more than a UART, but offered much higher speeds of up to 250 kilobits per second (or higher with additional hardware) and internally supported a number of basic networking-like protocols like IBM's Bisync.

The SCC was chosen because it would allow multiple devices to be attached to the port. Peripherals equipped with similar SCCs could communicate using the built-in protocols, interleaving their data with other peripherals on the same bus. This would eliminate the need for more ports on the back of the machine, and allowed for the elimination of expansion slots for supporting more complex devices. The initial concept was known as AppleBus, envisioning a system controlled by the host Macintosh polling "dumb" devices in a fashion similar to the modern Universal Serial Bus.

=== AppleBus networking ===
The Macintosh team had already begun work on what would become the LaserWriter and had considered a number of other options to answer the question of how to share these expensive machines and other resources. A series of memos from Bob Belleville clarified these concepts, outlining the Mac, LaserWriter, and a file server system which would become the Macintosh Office. By late 1983 it was clear that IBM's Token Ring would not be ready in time for the launch of the Mac, and might miss the launch of these other products as well. In the end, Token Ring would not ship until October 1985.

Jobs' earlier question to Sidhu had already sparked a number of ideas. When AppleNet was cancelled in October, Sidhu led an effort to develop a new networking system based on the AppleBus hardware. This new system would not have to conform to any existing preconceptions, and was designed to be worthy of the Mac – a system that was user-installable and required no configuration or fixed network addresses – in short, a true plug-and-play network. Considerable effort was needed, but by the time the Mac was released, the basic concepts had been outlined, and some of the low-level protocols were on their way to completion. Sidhu mentioned the work to Belleville only two hours after the Mac was announced.

The "new" AppleBus was announced in early 1984, (Note: AppleBus is mentioned by name in Steve Jobs' introduction of the Macintosh at the Boston Computer Society meeting in 1984. It appears just after the 7:20 mark in the video.) allowing direct connection from the Mac or Lisa through a small box that is plugged into the serial port and connected via cables to the next computer upstream and downstream. Adaptors for Apple II and Apple III were also announced. Apple also announced that an AppleBus network could be attached to, and would appear to be a single node within, a Token Ring system. Details of how this would work were sketchy.

=== AppleTalk Personal Network ===
Just prior to its release in early 1985, AppleBus was renamed AppleTalk. Initially marketed as AppleTalk Personal Network, it is a family of network protocols and a physical layer.

The physical layer has a number of limitations, including a speed of only 230.4 kbps, a maximum distance of 1,000 feet (300 m) from end to end, and only 32 nodes per LAN. By contrast StarLAN—among the slowest of networking standards—has a speed of 1 Mbps. But as the basic hardware was built into the Mac, adding nodes only cost about $50 for the adaptor box. In comparison, Ethernet and Token Ring cards cost hundreds or thousands of dollars. Additionally, the entire networking stack requires only about 6 kB of RAM, allowing it to run on any Mac.

The relatively slow speed of AppleTalk allowed further reductions in cost. Instead of using RS-422's balanced transmit and receive circuits, AppleTalk cabling uses a single common electrical ground, which limits speeds to about 500 kbit/s, but allowed one conductor to be removed. This means that common three-conductor cables can be used for wiring. Additionally, the adaptors were designed to be "self-terminating", meaning that nodes at the end of the network can leave their last connector unconnected. There is no need for the wires to be connected back together into a loop, nor the need for hubs or other devices.

The system was designed for future expansion; the addressing system allows for expansion to 255 nodes in a LAN (although only 32 could be used at that time), and by using "bridges" (which came to be known as "routers", although technically not the same) one can interconnect LANs into larger collections. "Zones" allow devices to be addressed within a bridge-connected internet. Additionally, AppleTalk was designed from the start to allow use with any potential underlying physical link, and within a few years, the physical layer would be renamed LocalTalk, so as to differentiate it from the AppleTalk protocols.

One advantage of AppleTalk is that it is auto-configuring. To join a device to a network, a user plugs the adaptor into the machine, then connects a cable from it to any free port on any other adaptor. The AppleTalk network stack negotiates a network address, and compiles a list of names and types of other machines on the network so the user can browse the devices through the Chooser. AppleTalk is so easy to use that ad hoc networks tended to appear whenever multiple Macs were in the same room. Apple would later use this in an advertisement showing a network being created between two seats in an airplane. A disadvantage of AppleTalk Personal Network is that cable connectors easily separate, causing network failures.

=== PhoneNet and other adaptors ===
Slow but inexpensive, AppleTalk became widely popular. A thriving third-party market for AppleTalk devices developed over the next few years. One particularly notable example was an alternate adaptor designed by BMUG and commercialised by Farallon as PhoneNET in 1987. This was essentially a replacement for Apple's connector using conventional phone jacks instead of Apple's round connectors. PhoneNet allows AppleTalk networks to be connected together using normal telephone wires, and with very little extra work, analog phones and AppleTalk can share a single four-conductor phone cable.

Other companies took advantage of the SCC's ability to read external clocks in order to support higher transmission speeds, up to 1 Mbit/s. In these systems, the external adaptor also included its own clock and used that to signal the SCC's clock input pins. The best-known such system was Centram's FlashTalk, which ran at 768 kbit/s and was intended to be used with their TOPS networking system. A similar solution was the 850 kbit/s DaynaTalk, which used a separate box that plugged in between the computer and a normal LocalTalk/PhoneNet box. Dayna also offered a PC expansion card that ran up to 1.7 Mbit/s when talking to other Dayna PC cards. Several other systems also existed with even higher performance, but these often required special cabling that was incompatible with LocalTalk/PhoneNet, and also required patches to the networking stack that often caused problems.

=== AppleTalk over Ethernet ===
As Apple expanded into more commercial and education markets, they needed to integrate AppleTalk into existing network installations. Many of these organisations had already invested in a very expensive Ethernet infrastructure and there was no direct way to connect a Macintosh to Ethernet. AppleTalk included a protocol structure for interconnecting AppleTalk subnets and so as a solution, EtherTalk was initially created to use the Ethernet as a backbone between LocalTalk subnets. To accomplish this, organizations would need to purchase a LocalTalk-to-Ethernet bridge and Apple left it to third parties to produce these products. A number of companies responded, including Hayes and a few newly formed companies like Kinetics.

=== LocalTalk, EtherTalk, TokenTalk, and AppleShare ===
By 1987, Ethernet was clearly winning the standards battle over Token Ring, and in the middle of that year, Apple introduced EtherTalk 1.0, an implementation of the AppleTalk protocol over the Ethernet physical layer. Introduced for the newly released Macintosh II computer, one of Apple's first two Macintoshes with expansion slots (the Macintosh SE had one slot of a different type), the operating system included a new Network control panel that allowed the user to select which physical connection to use for networking (from "Built-in" or "EtherTalk"). At introduction, Ethernet interface cards were available from 3Com and Kinetics that plugged into a NuBus slot in the machine. The new networking stack also expanded the system to allow a full 255 nodes per LAN. With EtherTalk's release, AppleTalk Personal Network was renamed LocalTalk, the name it would be known under for the bulk of its life. Token Ring would later be supported with a similar TokenTalk product, which used the same Network control panel and underlying software. Over time, many third-party companies would introduce compatible Ethernet and Token Ring cards that used these same drivers.

The appearance of a Macintosh with a direct Ethernet connection also magnified the Ethernet and LocalTalk compatibility problem: Networks with new and old Macs needed some way to communicate with each other. This could be as simple as a network of Ethernet Mac II's trying to talk to a LaserWriter that only connected to LocalTalk. Apple initially relied on the aforementioned LocalTalk-to-Ethernet bridge products, but contrary to Apple's belief that these would be low-volume products, by the end of 1987, 130,000 such networks were in use. AppleTalk was at that time reportedly the most used networking system in the world, with over three times the installations of any other vendor. 1987 also marked the introduction of the AppleShare product, a dedicated file server that ran on any Mac with 512 kB of RAM or more. A common AppleShare machine was the Mac Plus with an external SCSI hard drive, such as the Hard Disk 20SC. AppleShare was effectively the replacement for the failed Macintosh Office efforts, which had been based on a dedicated file server device.

AppleShare was the #3 network operating system (NOS) in the late 1980s, behind Novell NetWare and Microsoft's MS-Net. While NetWare had more than 50% of the NOS market, AppleTalk users were the happiest. A 1989 survey of 100 large LAN users found that 6% used Apple, fifth among vendors.

=== AppleTalk Phase II and other developments ===
A significant re-design was released in 1989 as AppleTalk Phase II. In many ways, Phase II can be considered an effort to make the earlier version (never called Phase I) more generic. LANs could now support more than 255 nodes, and zones were no longer associated with physical networks but were entirely virtual constructs used simply to organize nodes. For instance, one could now make a "Printers" zone that would list all the printers in an organization, or one might want to place that same device in the "2nd Floor" zone to indicate its physical location. Phase II also included changes to the underlying inter-networking protocols to make them less "chatty", which had previously been a serious problem on networks that bridged over wide-area networks.

By this point, Apple had a wide variety of communications products under development, and many of these were announced along with AppleTalk Phase II. These included updates to EtherTalk and TokenTalk, AppleTalk software and LocalTalk hardware for the IBM PC, EtherTalk for Apple's A/UX operating system, allowing it to use LaserWriters and other network resources, and the Mac X.25 and MacX products.

Ethernet had become almost universal by 1990, and it was time to build Ethernet into Macs direct from the factory. However, the physical wiring used by these networks was not yet completely standardized. Apple solved this problem using a single port on the back of the computer into which the user could plug an adaptor for any given cabling system. This FriendlyNet system was based on the industry-standard Attachment Unit Interface, or AUI, but with a non-standard connector that was smaller and easier to use, which they called "Apple AUI", or AAUI. FriendlyNet was first introduced on the Quadra 700 and Quadra 900 computers and used across much of the Mac line for some time. With System 7 Apple added Personal File Sharing, a simpler version of AppleShare. As with LocalTalk, a number of third-party FriendlyNet adaptors quickly appeared.

As 10BASE-T became the de facto cabling system for Ethernet, second-generation Power Macintosh machines added a 10BASE-T port in addition to AAUI. The PowerBook 3400c and lower-end Power Macs also added 10BASE-T. The Power Macintosh 7300/8600/9600 were the final Macs to include AAUI, and 10BASE-T became universal starting with the Power Macintosh G3 and PowerBook G3.

=== The capital-I Internet ===
From the beginning of AppleTalk, users wanted to connect the Macintosh to TCP/IP network environments. In 1984, Bill Croft at Stanford University pioneered the development of IP packets encapsulated in DDP as part of the SEAGATE (Stanford Ethernet–AppleTalk Gateway) project. SEAGATE was commercialized by Kinetics in their LocalTalk-to-Ethernet bridge as an additional routing option. A few years later, MacIP was separated from the SEAGATE code and became the de facto method for IP packets to be routed over LocalTalk networks. By 1986, Columbia University released the first version of the Columbia AppleTalk Package (CAP), which allowed higher integration of Unix, TCP/IP, and AppleTalk environments. In 1988, Apple released MacTCP, a system that allowed the Mac to support TCP/IP on machines with suitable Ethernet hardware. However, this left many universities with the problem of supporting IP on their many LocalTalk-equipped Macs. It was soon common to include MacIP support in LocalTalk-to-Ethernet bridges. MacTCP would not become a standard part of the Classic Mac OS until 1994, by which time it also supported SNMP and PPP.

For some time in the early 1990s, the Mac was a primary client on the rapidly expanding Internet.Among the better-known programs in wide use were Fetch, Eudora, eXodus, NewsWatcher, and the NCSA packages, especially NCSA Mosaic and its offspring, Netscape Navigator. Additionally, a number of server products appeared that allowed the Mac to host Internet content. Through this period, Macs had about 2 to 3 times as many clients connected to the Internet as any other platform, despite the relatively small overall microcomputer market share.

As the world quickly moved to IP for both LAN and WAN uses, Apple was faced with maintaining two increasingly outdated code bases on an ever-wider group of machines as well as the introduction of the PowerPC-based machines. This led to the Open Transport efforts, which re-implemented both MacTCP and AppleTalk on an entirely new code base adapted from the Unix standard STREAMS. Early versions had problems and did not become stable for some time. By that point, Apple was deep in their ultimately doomed Copland efforts.

=== Legacy and abandonment ===
With the purchase of NeXT and subsequent development of Mac OS X, AppleTalk was strictly a legacy system. Support was added to Mac OS X in order to provide support for a large number of existing AppleTalk devices, notably laser printers and file shares, but alternate connection solutions common in this era, notably USB for printers, limited their demand. As Apple abandoned many of these product categories, and all new systems were based on IP, AppleTalk became less and less common.

iMac G3 was the first Macintosh without LocalTalk hardware. AppleTalk support was finally removed from the macOS line in Mac OS X Snow Leopard in 2009, although AFP over TCP support remained.

However, the loss of AppleTalk did not reduce the desire for networking solutions that combined its ease of use with IP routing. Apple has led the development of many such efforts, from the introduction of the AirPort router to the development of the zero-configuration networking system and their implementation of it, Rendezvous, later renamed Bonjour.

AFP over TCP support was removed from legacy support in macOS 11 Big Sur.

Linux 7.2 removed support for AppleTalk.

== Design ==
The AppleTalk design followed the OSI model of protocol layering. Unlike most of the early LAN systems, AppleTalk was not built using the archetypal Xerox XNS system. The intended target was not Ethernet, and it did not have 48-bit addresses to route. Nevertheless, many portions of the AppleTalk system have direct analogs in XNS.

One key differentiation for AppleTalk was it contained two protocols aimed at making the system completely self-configuring. The AppleTalk address resolution protocol (AARP) allowed AppleTalk hosts to automatically generate their own network addresses, and the Name Binding Protocol (NBP) was a dynamic system for mapping network addresses to user-readable names. Although systems similar to AARP existed in other systems, Banyan VINES for instance. Beginning about 2002 Rendezvous (the combination of DNS-based service discovery, Multicast DNS, and link-local addressing) provided capabilities and usability using IP that were similar to those of AppleTalk.

Both AARP and NBP had defined ways to allow "controller" devices to override the default mechanisms. The concept was to allow routers to provide the information or "hardwire" the system to known addresses and names. On larger networks where AARP could cause problems as new nodes searched for free addresses, the addition of a router could reduce "chattiness." Together AARP and NBP made AppleTalk an easy-to-use networking system. New machines were added to the network by plugging them in and optionally giving them a name. The NBP lists were examined and displayed by a program known as the Chooser which would display a list of machines on the local network, divided into classes such as file-servers and printers.

== Addressing ==
An AppleTalk address was a four-byte quantity. This consisted of a two-byte network number, a one-byte node number, and a one-byte socket number. Of these, only the network number required any configuration, being obtained from a router. Each node dynamically chose its own node number, according to a protocol (originally the LocalTalk Link Access Protocol LLAP and later, for Ethernet/EtherTalk, the AppleTalk Address Resolution Protocol, AARP) which handled contention between different nodes accidentally choosing the same number. For socket numbers, a few well-known numbers were reserved for special purposes specific to the AppleTalk protocol itself. Apart from these, all application-level protocols were expected to use dynamically assigned socket numbers at both the client and server end.

Because of this dynamism, users could not be expected to access services by specifying their address. Instead, all services had names which, being chosen by humans, could be expected to be meaningful to users, and also could be sufficiently long to minimize the chance of conflicts.

As NBP names translated to an address, which included a socket number as well as a node number, a name in AppleTalk mapped directly to a service being provided by a machine, which was entirely separate from the name of the machine itself. Thus, services could be moved to a different machine and, so long as they kept the same service name, there was no need for users to do anything different in order to continue accessing the service. And the same machine could host any number of instances of services of the same type, without any network connection conflicts.

Contrast this with A records in the DNS, in which a name translates to a machine's address, not including the port number that might be providing a service. Thus, if people are accustomed to using a particular machine name to access a particular service, their access will break when the service is moved to a different machine. This can be mitigated somewhat by insistence on using CNAME records indicating service rather than actual machine names to refer to the service, but there is no way of guaranteeing that users will follow such a convention. Some newer protocols, such as Kerberos and Active Directory use DNS SRV records to identify services by name, which is much closer to the AppleTalk model.

== Protocols ==
=== AppleTalk Address Resolution Protocol ===
The AppleTalk Address Resolution Protocol (AARP) resolves AppleTalk addresses to link layer addresses. It is functionally equivalent to ARP and obtains address resolution by a method very similar to ARP.

AARP is a fairly simple system. When powered on, an AppleTalk machine broadcasts an AARP probe packet asking for a network address, intending to hear back from controllers such as routers. If no address is provided, one is picked at random from the "base subnet", 0. It then broadcasts another packet saying "I am selecting this address", and then waits to see if anyone else on the network complains. If another machine has that address, the newly connecting machine will pick another address, and keep trying until it finds a free one. On a network with many machines it may take several tries before a free address is found, so for performance purposes the successful address is recorded in NVRAM and used as the default address in the future. This means that in most real-world setups where machines are added a few at a time, only one or two tries are needed before the address effectively becomes constant.

=== AppleTalk Data Stream Protocol ===
The AppleTalk Data Stream Protocol (ADSP) was a comparatively late addition to the AppleTalk protocol suite, done when it became clear that a TCP-style reliable connection-oriented transport was needed. Significant differences from TCP were that:

- A connection attempt could be rejected.
- There were no "half-open" connections; once one end initiated a tear-down of the connection, the whole connection would be closed (i.e., ADSP is full-duplex, not dual simplex).
- AppleTalk had an included attention message system which allowed short messages to be sent which would bypass the normal stream data flow. These were delivered reliably but out of order with respect to the stream. Any attention message would be delivered as soon as possible instead of waiting for the current stream byte sequence point to become current.

=== Apple Filing Protocol ===
The Apple Filing Protocol (AFP), formerly AppleTalk Filing Protocol, is the protocol for communicating with AppleShare file servers. Built on top of AppleTalk Session Protocol (for legacy AFP over DDP) or the Data Stream Interface (for AFP over TCP), it provides services for authenticating users (extensible to different authentication methods including two-way random-number exchange) and for performing operations specific to the Macintosh HFS filesystem. AFP over TCP remained in use in macOS until Big Sur, even though most other AppleTalk protocols were removed in Snow Leopard.

=== AppleTalk Session Protocol ===
The AppleTalk Session Protocol (ASP) was an intermediate protocol, built on top of AppleTalk Transaction Protocol (ATP), which in turn was the foundation of AFP. It provided basic services for requesting responses to arbitrary commands and performing out-of-band status queries. It also allowed the server to send asynchronous attention messages to the client.

=== AppleTalk Transaction Protocol ===
The AppleTalk Transaction Protocol (ATP) was the original reliable transport-level protocol for AppleTalk, built on top of DDP. At the time it was being developed, a full, reliable connection-oriented protocol like TCP was considered to be too expensive to implement for most of the intended uses of AppleTalk. Thus, ATP was a simple request/response exchange, with no need to set up or tear down connections.

An ATP request packet could be answered by up to eight response packets. The requestor then sent an acknowledgement packet containing a bit mask indicating which of the response packets it received, so the responder could retransmit the remainder.

ATP could operate in either "at-least-once" mode or "exactly-once" mode. Exactly-once mode was essential for operations which were not idempotent; in this mode, the responder kept a copy of the response buffers in memory until successful receipt of a release packet from the requestor, or until a timeout elapsed. This way, it could respond to duplicate requests with the same transaction ID by resending the same response data, without performing the actual operation again.

=== Datagram Delivery Protocol ===
The Datagram Delivery Protocol (DDP) was the lowest-level data-link-independent transport protocol. It provided a datagram service with no guarantees of delivery. All application-level protocols, including the infrastructure protocols NBP, RTMP and ZIP, were built on top of DDP. AppleTalk's DDP corresponds closely to the Network layer of the Open Systems Interconnection (OSI) communication model.

=== Name Binding Protocol ===
The Name Binding Protocol (NBP) was a dynamic, distributed system for managing AppleTalk names. When a service started up on a machine, it registered a name for itself as chosen by a human administrator. At this point, NBP provided a system for checking that no other machine had already registered the same name. Later, when a client wanted to access that service, it used NBP to query machines to find that service. NBP provided browsability ("what are the names of all the services available?") as well as the ability to find a service with a particular name. Names were human-readable, containing spaces and upper- and lower-case letters, and including support for searching.

=== AppleTalk Echo Protocol ===
The AppleTalk Echo Protocol (AEP) was a transport layer protocol designed to test the reachability of network nodes. AEP generates packets to be sent to the network node and is identified in the Type field of a packet as an AEP packet. The packet is first passed to the source DDP. After it is identified as an AEP packet, it is forwarded to the node where the packet is examined by the DDP at the destination. After the packet is identified as an AEP packet, the packet is then copied and a field in the packet is altered to create an AEP reply packet, and is then returned to the source node.

=== Printer Access Protocol ===
The Printer Access Protocol (PAP) was the standard way of communicating with PostScript printers. It was built on top of ATP. When a PAP connection was opened, each end sent the other an ATP request which basically meant "send me more data". The client's response to the server was to send a block of PostScript code, while the server could respond with any diagnostic messages that might be generated as a result, after which another "send-more-data" request was sent. This use of ATP provided automatic flow control; each end could only send data to the other end if there was an outstanding ATP request to respond to.

PAP also provided for out-of-band status queries, handled by separate ATP transactions. Even while it was busy servicing a print job from one client, a PAP server could continue to respond to status requests from any number of other clients. This allowed other Macintoshes on the LAN that were waiting to print to display status messages indicating that the printer was busy, and what the job was that it was busy with.

=== Routing Table Maintenance Protocol ===
The Routing Table Maintenance Protocol (RTMP) was the protocol by which routers kept each other informed about the topology of the network. This was the only part of AppleTalk that required periodic unsolicited broadcasts: every 10 seconds, each router had to send out a list of all the network numbers it knew about and how far away it thought they were.

=== Zone Information Protocol ===
The Zone Information Protocol (ZIP) was the protocol by which AppleTalk network numbers were associated with zone names. A zone was a subdivision of the network that made sense to humans (for example, "Accounting Department"); but while a network number had to be assigned to a topologically contiguous section of the network, a zone could include several different discontiguous portions of the network.

== Physical implementation ==
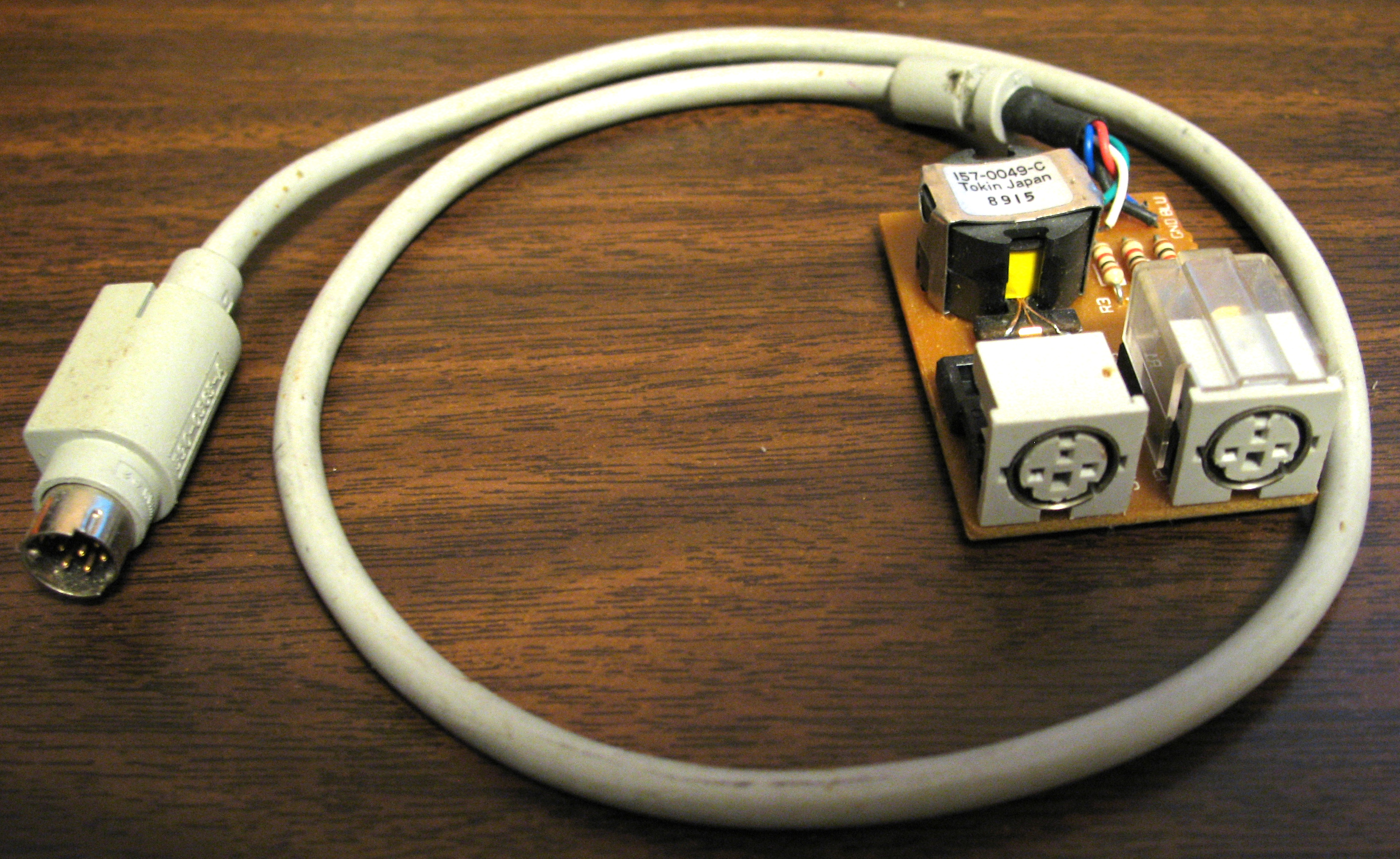
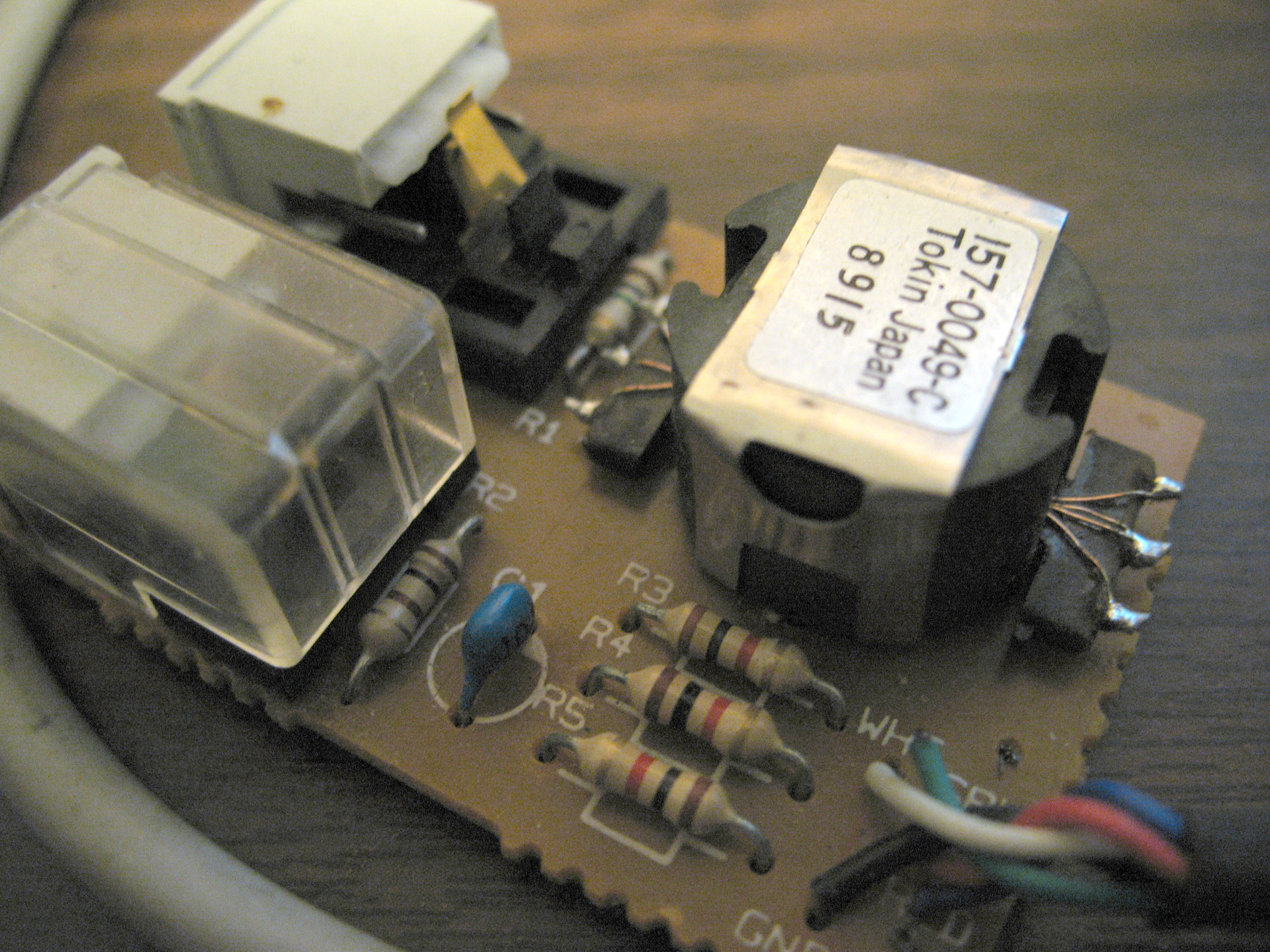
Interior of Apple LocalTalk interface box. In 1989, these boxes typically cost US$90 each. The connectors feature automatic electrical termination of the LocalTalk signal bus; insertion of a LocalTalk bus cable depresses a normally closed switch behind the connector, disabling termination for that connector.

Farallon PhoneNET adapter

The initial default hardware implementation for AppleTalk was a high-speed serial protocol known as LocalTalk that used the Macintosh's built-in RS-422 ports at 230.4 kbit/s. LocalTalk used a splitter box in the RS-422 port to provide an upstream and downstream cable from a single port. The topology was a bus: cables were daisy-chained from each connected machine to the next, up to the maximum of 32 permitted on any LocalTalk segment. The system was slow by today's standards, but at the time the additional cost and complexity of networking on PC machines was such that it was common that Macs were the only networked personal computers in an office. Other larger computers, such as UNIX or VAX workstations, would commonly be networked via Ethernet.

Other physical implementations were also available. A very popular replacement for LocalTalk was PhoneNET, a third-party solution from Farallon Computing, Inc. (renamed Netopia, acquired by Motorola in 2007) that also used the RS-422 port and was indistinguishable from LocalTalk as far as Apple's LocalTalk port drivers were concerned, but ran over very inexpensive standard phone cabling with four-wire, six-position modular connectors, the same cables used to connect landline telephones. Since it used the second pair of wires, network devices could even be connected through existing telephone jacks if a second line was not present. Foreshadowing today's network hubs and switches, Farallon provided solutions for PhoneNet to be used in star as well as bus configurations, with both passive star connections (with the phone wires simply bridged to each other at a central point), and active star with "PhoneNet Star Controller" hub hardware. In a star configuration, any wiring issue only affected one device, and problems were easy to pinpoint. PhoneNet's low cost, flexibility, and easy troubleshooting resulted in it being the dominant choice for Mac networks into the early 1990s.

AppleTalk protocols also came to run over Ethernet (first coaxial and then twisted pair) and Token Ring physical layers, labeled by Apple as EtherTalk and TokenTalk, respectively. EtherTalk gradually became the dominant implementation method for AppleTalk as Ethernet became generally popular in the PC industry throughout the 1990s. Besides AppleTalk and TCP/IP, any Ethernet network could also simultaneously carry other protocols such as DECnet and IPX.

== Networking model ==
OSI Model	Corresponding AppleTalk layers
Application	Apple Filing Protocol (AFP)
Presentation	Apple Filing Protocol (AFP)
Session	Zone Information Protocol (ZIP); AppleTalk Session Protocol (ASP); AppleTalk Data Stream Protocol (ADSP)
Transport	AppleTalk Transaction Protocol (ATP); AppleTalk Echo Protocol (AEP); Name Binding Protocol (NBP); Routing Table Maintenance Protocol (RTMP)
Network	Datagram Delivery Protocol (DDP)
Data link	EtherTalk Link Access Protocol (ELAP); LocalTalk Link Access Protocol (LLAP); TokenTalk Link Access Protocol (TLAP); Fiber Distributed Data Interface (FDDI)
Physical	LocalTalk driver Ethernet driver Token Ring driver FDDI driver

== Versions ==
AppleTalk version	Apple Filing Protocol	Corresponds to	Notes
56		System 7.0	
57.0.4		System 7.12	
58.1.1		System 7.1.2	
58.1.3		System 7.5	
60.3		Mac OS 7.6.1	Open Transport 1.3
60.0a6		Mac OS 8.6	Open Transport 2.0.3
	3.0	Mac OS X 10.0.3	
	2.1, 2.0 and even 1.1	Mac OS X v10.2	
	2.2, 3.0 and 3.1	Mac OS X v10.3	
	3.2	Mac OS X v10.4	

== Cross-platform solutions ==
By contrast to Macs, in the late 1980s no dominant LAN hardware standard existed for the most popular office computing platform, the PC compatible running MS-DOS. Apple introduced the AppleTalk PC Card in early 1987, allowing PCs to join AppleTalk networks and print to LaserWriter printers. A year later AppleShare PC was released, allowing PCs to access AppleShare file servers.

The "TOPS Teleconnector" MS-DOS networking system over AppleTalk system enabled MS-DOS PCs to communicate over AppleTalk network hardware; it comprised an AppleTalk interface card for the PC and a suite of networking software allowing such functions as file, drive and printer sharing. As well as allowing the construction of a PC-only AppleTalk network, it allowed communication between PCs and Macs with TOPS software installed. (Macs without TOPS installed could use the same network but only to communicate with other Apple machines.) The Mac TOPS software did not match the quality of Apple's own either in ease of use or in robustness and freedom from crashes, but the DOS software was relatively simple to use in DOS terms, and was robust.

The BSD and Linux operating systems support AppleTalk through an open source project called Netatalk, which implements the complete protocol suite and allows them to both act as native file or print servers for Macintosh computers, and print to LocalTalk printers over the network.

The Windows Server operating systems supported AppleTalk starting with Windows NT and ending after Windows Server 2003. Miramar included AppleTalk in its PC MacLAN product which was discontinued by CA in 2007. GroupLogic continues to bundle its AppleTalk protocol with its ExtremeZ-IP server software for Macintosh-Windows integration which supports Windows Server 2008 and Windows Vista as well prior versions. HELIOS Software GmbH offers a proprietary implementation of the AppleTalk protocol stack, as part of their HELIOS UB2 server. This is essentially a File and Print Server suite that runs on a whole range of different platforms.

In addition, Columbia University released the Columbia AppleTalk Package (CAP) which implemented the protocol suite for various Unix flavours including Ultrix, SunOS, BSD and IRIX. This package is no longer actively maintained.

Since 2026, TailTalk is serving enthusiast needs in providing the original DDP based AppleTalk for macOS, Linux and Windows systems as user-level implemantation. As such, in contrast to Netatalk, it does not depend on AppleTalk in the kernel or on other software to communicate between hardware like historical Apple printers or machines of the early Macintosh era and modern systems again.

== See also ==
- Netatalk is a free, open-source implementation of the AppleTalk suite of protocols.
- Network File System
- Remote File Sharing
- Samba
- Server Message Block
