= Mentat Portable Streams =

Mentat Portable Streams (MPS) was a platform independent implementation of the UNIX System V STREAMS networking protocol stack, normally sold with the Mentat TCP stack providing TCP/IP support. Portable Streams was used in a number of commercial products, including Apple Computer's Open Transport, AIX, VxWorks, Palm OS's Cobalt, Novell's UnixWare and other systems. Mentat also ported the system to Linux and Windows NT as a standalone product. Portable Streams was written by Mentat, who was purchased by Packeteer in 2004.
