= InterCon Systems =

American developer of TCP/IP networking software for Macintosh computers

InterCon Systems Corporation
- Type: Private (defunct)
- Industry: Software
- Founded: April 1988
- Founder: Kurt D. Baumann, Mikki Barry
- Defunct: 1997
- Fate: Acquired by PSINet; engineering group and products sold to Ascend Communications
- Area served: United States, Europe, Japan
- Products: TCP/Connect, TCP/Connect II, tcpCONNECT4, NFS/Share, NetShark, WebShark, InterSLIP, InterPPP, InterPrint, InterServer Publisher, Planet X, WatchTower
- Parent: PSINet (1995–1997)

InterCon Systems Corporation (a Virginia Corporation) was founded in April 1988 by Kurt D. Baumann and Mikki Barry to produce software to connect Macintosh computers in environments that were not Macintosh-exclusive. At the time, there was no real concept of the Internet and there was still a question of whether the TCP/IP protocols or OSI protocols would be adopted widely. Over the next 9 years, the company grew from three employees to over 100 and sold software in the US, Europe and Japan.

In June 1995, InterCon was acquired by PSINet and continued to sell and maintain its suite of TCP/IP software.

In February 1996, PSINet merged InterCon with Software Ventures (another Macintosh communication software company).

In February 1997, InterCon's engineering group and its products were sold to Ascend Communications.

== Products ==
In 1988, InterCon was pursuing two product lines, TCP/Connect (based originally on NCSA Telnet), and an email product. Unfortunately, the licensing for the email product fell through in negotiations, so it was never sold, and InterCon would have to wait a few more years (until TCP/Connect II) before it could provide email to customers.

=== TCP/Connect ===
TCP/Connect was InterCon's flagship product. Launched at Macworld Conference & Expo in August 1988, the product provided the same features as NCSA Telnet, with commercial technical support as its only significant added benefit. This was to change rapidly over the next few months, and by October of that year, InterCon was showing the product at the first InterOp Expo with new features including a graphical FTP Client (one of the first on the Macintosh) and IBM 3270 emulation.

Over the next few years, InterCon added more terminal emulation and file transfer capabilities to the product, but no other major protocols until the product was replaced with a significant rewrite: TCP/Connect II.

=== TCP/Connect II ===
TCP/Connect II was to remain InterCon's flagship product from 1990 until 1995. Although TCP/Connect was primarily a terminal emulation and file transfer program, TCP/Connect II branched out into a full-fledged internet suite. At introduction, it featured email and network news reader support along with additional terminal emulations in addition to the already-popular IBM 3270, and DEC VT-240 emulations.

Over the next 5 years, the product evolved quickly and kept or set the pace for many advanced features, including embedded graphics and multimedia content in email; advanced email automation, filtering, and highlighting; a high-speed web browser; a gopher client; and many minor features and protocols.

After the introduction of InterCon's web browser in TCP/Connect II, AOL licensed the browser in 1995 for use with their dial-up networking services. In order to separate the browser from the rest of the suite, it was dubbed WebShark.

=== tcpCONNECT4 ===
tcpCONNECT4 (renamed from TCP/Connect II and with additional features) was a "do-everything suite of TCP/IP applications for Internet or intranet use" that was released in 1996 and had few changes before the company's sale to Ascend Communications.

=== NFS/Share ===
NFS/Share was InterCon's second most popular product and provided high-performance access to file servers using the NFS protocol. NFS was used widely in educational environments because it was the key file sharing system for Sun Microsystems's line of UNIX servers. NFS/Share's adoption mirrored that popularity, finding a home in many educational institutions and pre-press environments.

NFS/Share used many techniques to increase performance and provide a smooth experience for users, as such providing some of the best performance in the marketplace.

=== Shark Series ===
In 1995, InterCon decided to more directly approach the consumer market with a series of "Shark" branded products; NetShark, WebShark, and MailShark. The products were directly derived from the source code for TCP/Connect II (or 4 at the time) and was missing the Terminal Emulation technology.

==== NetShark ====
NetShark (and the derivative MailShark) was an internet suite product based on TCP/Connect but including only email and web clients. The slimmed-down version was aimed at consumers, but never really became a popular offering.

==== MailShark ====
MailShark was created but never sold. It contained only the email portions of TCP/Connect.

==== WebShark ====
WebShark contained only the web browser portion of TCP/Connect. WebShark was licensed by AOL for use with their Macintosh clients to provide access to the web. A rebranded WebShark similarly shipped as Apple's eWorld Web Browser.

=== InterPPP/InterSLIP ===
InterSLIP and InterPPP were software packages that enabled Macintosh users to communicate over TCP/IP using dial-up lines without having to use an embedded TCP/IP stack. These products worked with Apple's MacTCP.

=== InterPrint ===
InterPrint was a printing product designed to allow Macintoshes to print to PostScript printers connected over TCP/IP networks. Mostly used in corporate and prepress environments, the product integrated directly into Apple's printer architecture.

=== InterServer Publisher ===
InterServer Publisher was a web, FTP, and gopher server package designed to run in the background on a Macintosh.

=== Planet X ===
Planet X was an X Window System client for Macintosh that allowed you to send the screen from your Macintosh as a window to any X Window System server. The product was developed by a third party and was marketed and sold by InterCon starting in 1991.

=== WatchTower ===
WatchTower was the first SNMP Network Monitoring System developed for the Macintosh computer Developed by GBP Software (now ClueTrust) and published and sold by InterCon starting in 1990, WatchTower was the first product of its kind on the Macintosh. Although it was never a high volume product (not surprising at a retail price of $2,495), it did represent the first monitor (and agent) for the Macintosh.

== IPv6 Participation ==
When the initial research for IPv6 was being done, InterCon participated by creating an implementation of the SIPP protocol running on the Macintosh as part of an experimental version of TCP/Connect II. Although SIPP wasn't adopted, this early effort confirmed the interest of Internet software vendors in creating IPv6-capable software.

== Internet Services in Japan (IIKK) ==
The IIKK's initial POP in Joi Ito's bathroom (1994)

In 1992, InterCon saw the need to expand commercial internet services in Japan in order to bolster its position in the TCP/IP market there. To do this, the company created a Japanese subsidiary, IIKK and partnered with AT&T JENS (a subsidiary of AT&T) to create the first commercial internet service providers in the country.

IIKK's initial POP was in Joi Ito's bathroom. IIKK's first offices were in an old karaoke bar in Myogadani.

PSINet purchased IIKK and it became the core of PSINet Japan.
