= Datagram Delivery Protocol =

Datagram Delivery Protocol (DDP) is a member of the AppleTalk networking protocol suite. Its main responsibility is for socket-to-socket delivery of datagrams over an AppleTalk network.

- Note: All application-level protocols, including the infrastructure protocols NBP, RTMP and ZIP were built on top of DDP.
