= File server =

Computer that provides file systems in a computer network

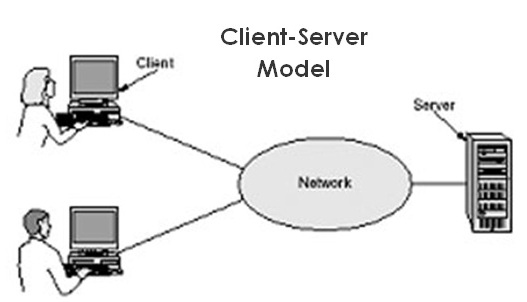
Client-Server Model

In computing, a file server (or fileserver) is a computer attached to a network that provides a location for shared disk access, i.e. storage of computer files (such as text, image, sound, video) that can be accessed by workstations within a computer network. The term server highlights the role of the machine in the traditional client–server scheme, where the clients are the workstations using the storage. A file server does not normally perform computational tasks or run programs on behalf of its client workstations (in other words, it is different from e.g. an application server, which is another type of server).

File servers are commonly found in schools and offices, where users use a local area network to connect their client computers.

== Types of file servers ==
A file server may be dedicated or non-dedicated. A dedicated server is designed specifically for use as a file server, with workstations attached for reading and writing files and databases.

File servers may also be categorized by the method of access: Internet file servers are frequently accessed by File Transfer Protocol (FTP) or by Hypertext Transfer Protocol (HTTP) but are different from web servers that often provide dynamic web content in addition to static files. Servers on a LAN are usually accessed by SMB/CIFS protocol (Windows and Unix-like) or NFS protocol (Unix-like systems).

Database servers, that provide access to a shared database via a database device driver, are not regarded as file servers even when the database is stored in files, as they are not designed to provide those files to users and tend to have differing technical requirements.

== Design of file servers ==
In modern businesses, the design of file servers is complicated by competing demands for storage space, access speed, recoverability, ease of administration, security, and budget. This is further complicated by a constantly changing environment, where new hardware and technology rapidly obsolesces old equipment, and yet must seamlessly come online in a fashion compatible with the older machinery. To manage throughput, peak loads, and response time, vendors may utilize queuing theory to model how the combination of hardware and software will respond over various levels of demand. Servers may also employ dynamic load balancing scheme to distribute requests across various pieces of hardware.

The primary piece of hardware equipment for servers over the last couple of decades has proven to be the hard disk drive. Although other forms of storage are viable (such as magnetic tape and solid-state drives) disk drives have continued to offer the best fit for cost, performance, and capacity.

=== Storage ===
Since the crucial function of a file server is storage, technology has been developed to operate multiple disk drives together as a team, forming a disk array. A disk array typically has cache (temporary memory storage that is faster than the magnetic disks), as well as advanced functions like RAID and storage virtualization. Typically disk arrays increase level of availability by using redundant components other than RAID, such as power supplies. Disk arrays may be consolidated or virtualized in a SAN.

=== Network-attached storage ===
Network-attached storage (NAS) is file-level computer data storage connected to a computer network providing data access to a heterogeneous group of clients. NAS devices specifically are distinguished from file servers generally in a NAS being a computer appliance – a specialized computer built from the ground up for serving files – rather than a general purpose computer being used for serving files (possibly with other functions). In discussions of NASs, the term "file server" generally stands for a contrasting term, referring to general purpose computers only.

As of 2010 NAS devices are gaining popularity, offering a convenient method for sharing files between multiple computers. Potential benefits of network-attached storage, compared to non-dedicated file servers, include faster data access, easier administration, and simple configuration.

NAS systems are networked appliances containing one or more hard drives, often arranged into logical, redundant storage containers or RAID arrays. Network Attached Storage removes the responsibility of file serving from other servers on the network. They typically provide access to files using network file sharing protocols such as NFS, SMB/CIFS (Server Message Block/Common Internet File System), or AFP.

=== Security ===
File servers generally offer some form of system security to limit access to files to specific users or groups. In large organizations, this is a task usually delegated to directory services, such as openLDAP, Novell's eDirectory or Microsoft's Active Directory.

These servers work within the hierarchical computing environment which treat users, computers, applications and files as distinct but related entities on the network and grant access based on user or group credentials. In many cases, the directory service spans many file servers, potentially hundreds for large organizations. In the past, and in smaller organizations, authentication could take place directly at the server itself.

== See also ==
- Backup
- File Transfer Protocol (FTP)
- Network-attached storage (NAS)
- Server Message Block (SMB)
- WebDAV
