= GroupLogic =

American enterprise software company

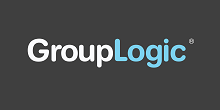
- Type: Private
- Industry: Computer software
- Founded: August 1, 1988
- Headquarters: Arlington, Virginia, U.S.
- Key people: Chris Broderick (CEO); T. Reid Lewis (President); David Stokley (CFO); Derick Naef (CTO); Andy Lewis (SVP); Anders Lofgren (VP, Product Management); Summer Benish (VP, Sales); Todd While (VP, Mobility Solutions)
- Number of employees: 40
- Website: www.grouplogic.com

GroupLogic, Inc., founded in 1988 and headquartered in Arlington, Virginia, U.S., is an enterprise software company that develops, sells and supports software for moving and storing data including activEcho, mobilEcho, ArchiveConnect, MassTransit and ExtremeZ-IP. GroupLogic's products are used by information technology organizations to allow employees to access and manage corporate files regardless of the type of computing platform the employee is using to access the network.

On September 13, 2012, GroupLogic announced that it became a subsidiary of Acronis, a software company specializing in backup and disaster recovery products and services.

== Sources ==
- "GroupLogic Dives Into the Online File Storage Pool". Archived from the original on 16 March 2012.
- "GroupLogic Has New Way To Securely Synch Your Files With ActivEcho". Archived from the original on 17 March 2012.
- "451 Group - GroupLogic extends mobile sync support with new activEcho product" (PDF).
- Slate Group Logic: What can a tiny software firm show us about the future of American exports 16-Nov-2010
- Mac Observer Interviews Group Logic CEO
- BusinessWeek Private Company Information: Group Logic, Inc.
- Key Issues for Managed File Transfer, 2009 19 February 2009 | ID:G00165299
- Moving Beyond MFT to File Services 29 May 2009 | ID:G00168386
- Data Encryption Not Enough to Prevent FTP Credential Theft 6 July 2009 | ID:G00169584
- Hype Cycle for Data and Application Security, 2009 17 July 2009 | ID:G00168605
