= MacTCP =

MacTCP is the standard TCP/IP implementation for the classic Mac OS through version 7.5.1. It is the first application-independent implementation of a TCP stack for a non-Unix platform and predates Winsock by over 5 years. Released in 1988, it is obsolete and has reliability issues and incomplete features that sometimes prevent it from operating properly on the modern Internet. The API is proprietary to Mac OS, and at least one developer released a Berkeley Sockets-derived API to make porting from other platforms easier.

It was originally a substantial purchase, at $2,500 (equivalent to $7,000 in 2025) for a site license, with an additional $2,500 fee for commercial use. The price was lowered until by the mid-1990s it was $60 (equivalent to $130 in 2025). MacTCP is included free with System 7.5, when the rising popularity of the Internet made it a necessity. Apple replaced it in 1995 with Open Transport, which has an improved interface for user configuration, although MacTCP remained in use on older systems due to its generally lower system requirements.
