= Henry Norr =

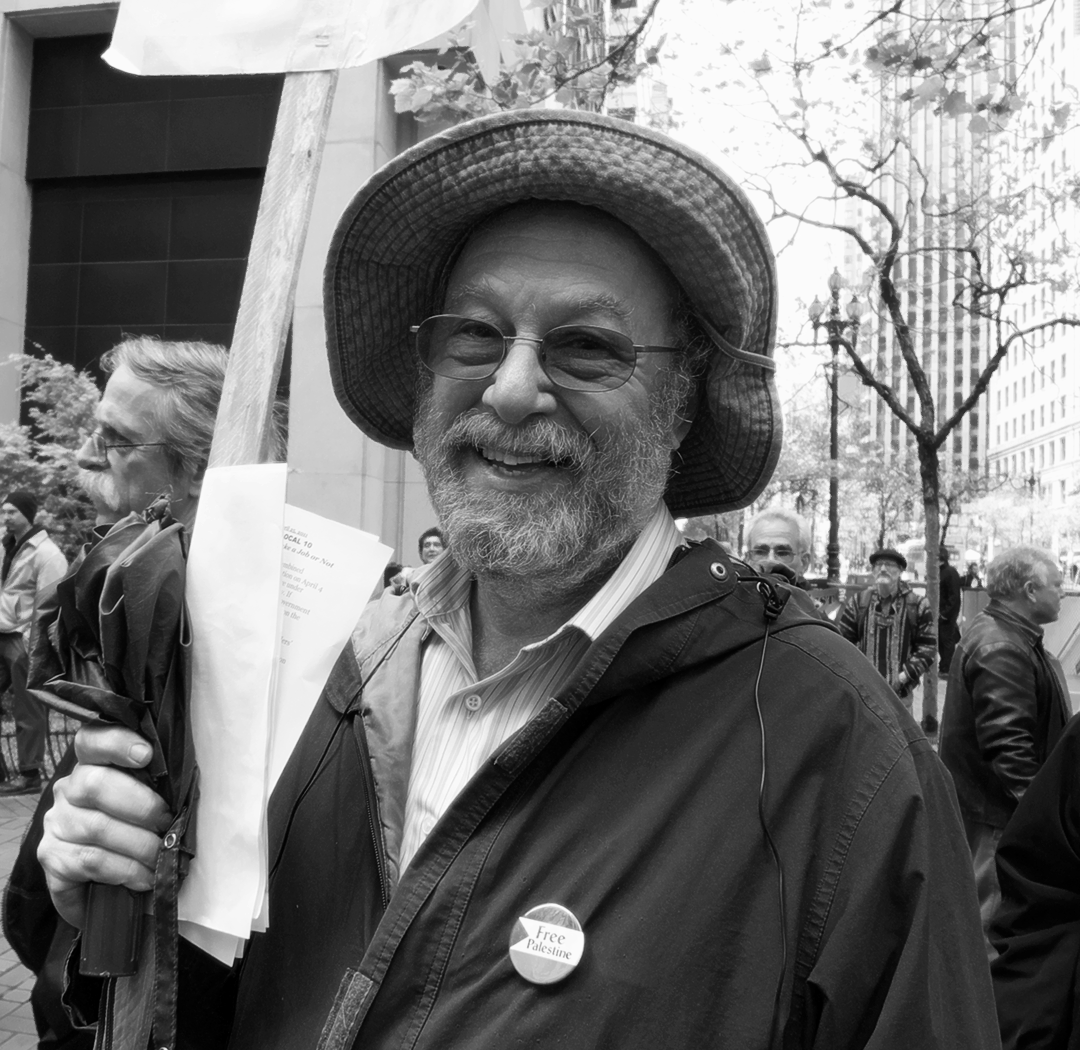
Henry Norr

Henry Norr (born 1946) is an American technology journalist and activist. He was formerly a technology columnist at the San Francisco Chronicle.

In 2002, Norr wrote in the Chronicle about Intel Corp.'s Fab 18 chip plant in Qiryat Gat, Israel, which was responsible for $1.8 billion in exports. The column was controversial because of the land ownership issues stemming from the 1948 Arab–Israeli war. Pro-Israel organizations accused him of being antisemitic, which he denies, pointing out that he is Jewish.

Norr was fired in April 2003. He had been arrested in an anti-war demonstration on March 20, the day after the United States attacked Iraq. The Chronicle suspended him without pay. A few days later, they fired him. California law prohibits employers from firing employees on the basis of political activities. The Chronicle's employee rules also permitted workers to attend demonstrations and engage in political activity. The Chronicle told Norr he was fired for falsifying his time card. Others in the newsroom said that he was fired for his political activity, which included involvement in Palestine solidarity work.

In 2004, Norr received a financial settlement with The Chronicle over the firing, which included his retirement, health benefits, and a statement published in the Chronicle. Norr said the settlement would allow him to continue freelance writing.

He now writes for the MacInTouch and Mondoweiss web sites, among others.
