= MacInTouch =

Technology news website

- Website type: News and information related to Apple Inc., iTunes, iPhone, Mac, security and privacy
- Available in: English
- Owner: MacInTouch Inc.
- Creator: MacInTouch Inc. (Ric Ford)
- Website: www.macintouch.com
- Commercial: Yes
- Launched: 1994; 32 years ago
- Current status: Active

MacInTouch is a daily news and information website that provides independent coverage of Apple's Mac and iOS platforms, along with other topics such as security and privacy, networking, and technological innovation. MacInTouch's moderated forums provide technical analysis, problem-solving and news from the community. MacInTouch also provides product updates and occasional product reviews.

== History ==
"MacInTouch" began as an independent print journal in 1985, originally published by Ford-LePage Inc., to provide news and information about Macintosh computers. The MacInTouch Home Page website, created by Ric Ford in 1994, was serving daily Mac news and information to more than a million people by 1998. It's noted as being one of several blog-style sites that predate the definition of a blog.

MacInTouch Inc. is incorporated in the Commonwealth of Massachusetts.

== Other ==
In 1993, MacInTouch analysis of a bug in Apple's HFS file system prompted a nomination for a (non-existent) "Pulitzer Prize in computer journalism."

In 1999, MacInTouch was noted in Linux Today for "Most tasteful and cool April foolishness: MacInTouch's transformation to MonkInTouch, complete with piano motif and lots of links to Thelonious Monk stuff."

In 2006, MacInTouch published an independent analysis of Apple Mac notebook reliability based on a survey of over 10,000 notebooks spanning 41 models.

In 2007, MacInTouch first reported a severe data-loss bug in Mac OS X 10.5 Leopard's Finder.

On 30 August 2021, Ric Ford (owner of MacInTouch) stated “As a business, MacInTouch is no longer viable, but thanks to supporters and special contributors, I hope to continue providing this website and subscriber/supporter services to the extent practical, which means some streamlining and project delays.”

On 4 June 2025, Ric Ford put Macintouch on hiatus, saying "I personally need to stop and take a break for a while to re-assess priorities and approaches going forward. I'm putting macintouch.com on pause in an attempt to stem the rising costs..."
