= Mac Pro =

Series of computers by Apple

- 2023 Mac Pro
- Developer: Apple
- Type: Full-sized desktop; Workstation; Server
- Released: August 7, 2006; 20 years ago
- Discontinued: March 26, 2026; 7 months ago
- Operating system: macOS
- Predecessor: Power Mac G5, Xserve
- Successor: Mac Studio
- Related: iMac, Mac Mini, Mac Studio, iMac Pro
- Website: Mac Pro at the Wayback Machine (archived March 25, 2026)

The Mac Pro is a discontinued series of workstation computer and servers made by Apple from 2006 to 2026. The Mac Pro served as the high-end personal computer in Apple's lineup. Introduced in August 2006, the Mac Pro is the successor of the Power Mac line, using Intel Xeon rather than PowerPC processors. It shipped in a tower case carried over from the Power Mac G5. Updates added faster processors, memory, and graphics, alongside changed I/O and built-to-order options. In 2013, Apple released a significant revision to the Mac Pro, housing the computer components in a smaller, cylindrical design that eschewed internal expansion. Limitations of the cylindrical design prevented Apple from upgrading the cylindrical Mac Pro with more powerful hardware. The 2019 Mac Pro returned to a tower form factor reminiscent of the first-generation model.

The 2023 Mac Pro was the last Apple computer to migrate from Intel processors to Apple's own M-series chips. It was criticized for its lack of GPU support or user-expandability compared to prior models, and for its high price premium compared to the similar performance configurations of the professional-oriented Mac Studio. Apple discontinued the Mac Pro line on March 26, 2026, and positioned the more compact Mac Studio as its successor.

== First tower series (2006–2012) ==
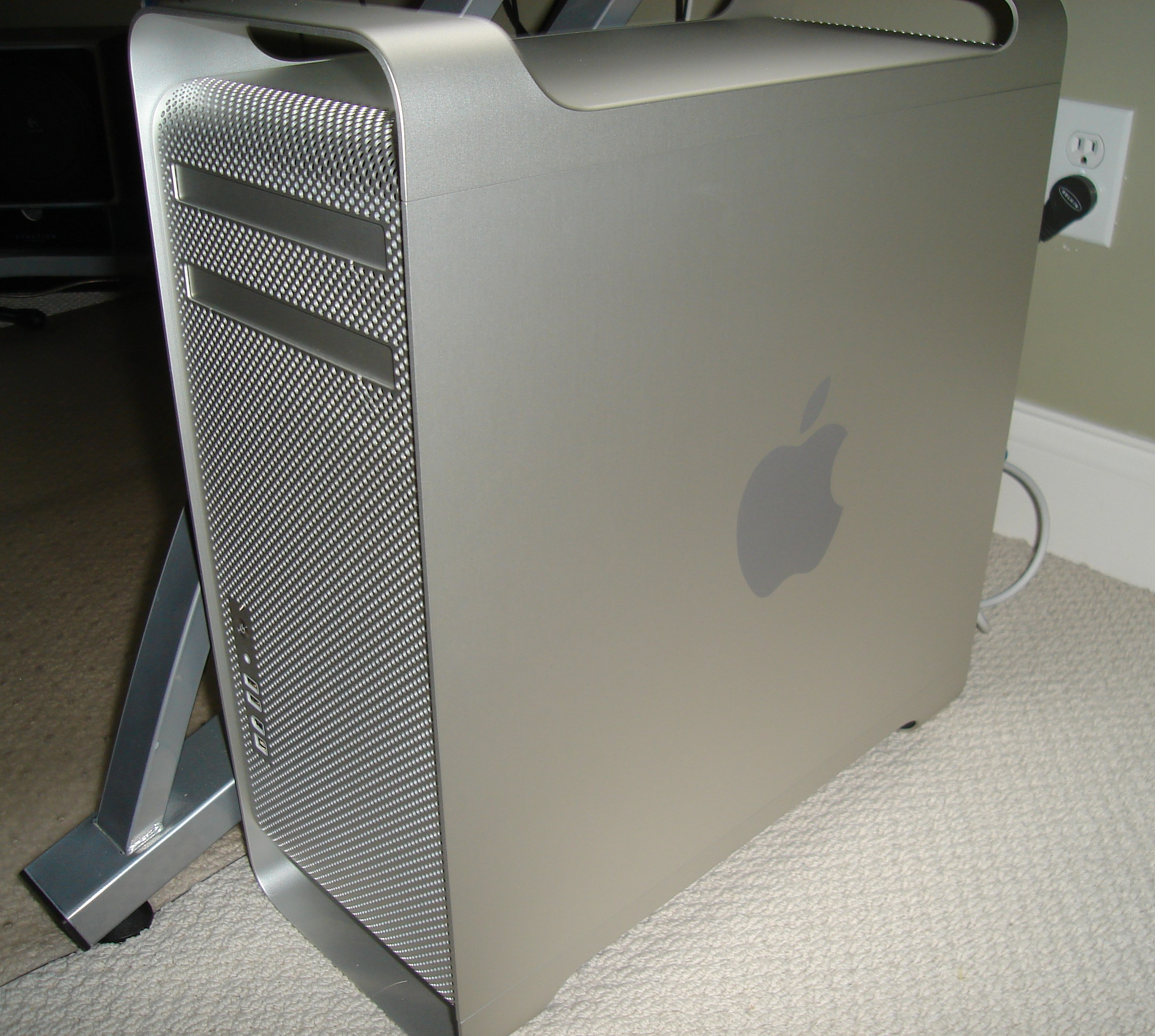
The initial Mac Pro models reused the case design of the Power Mac G5.

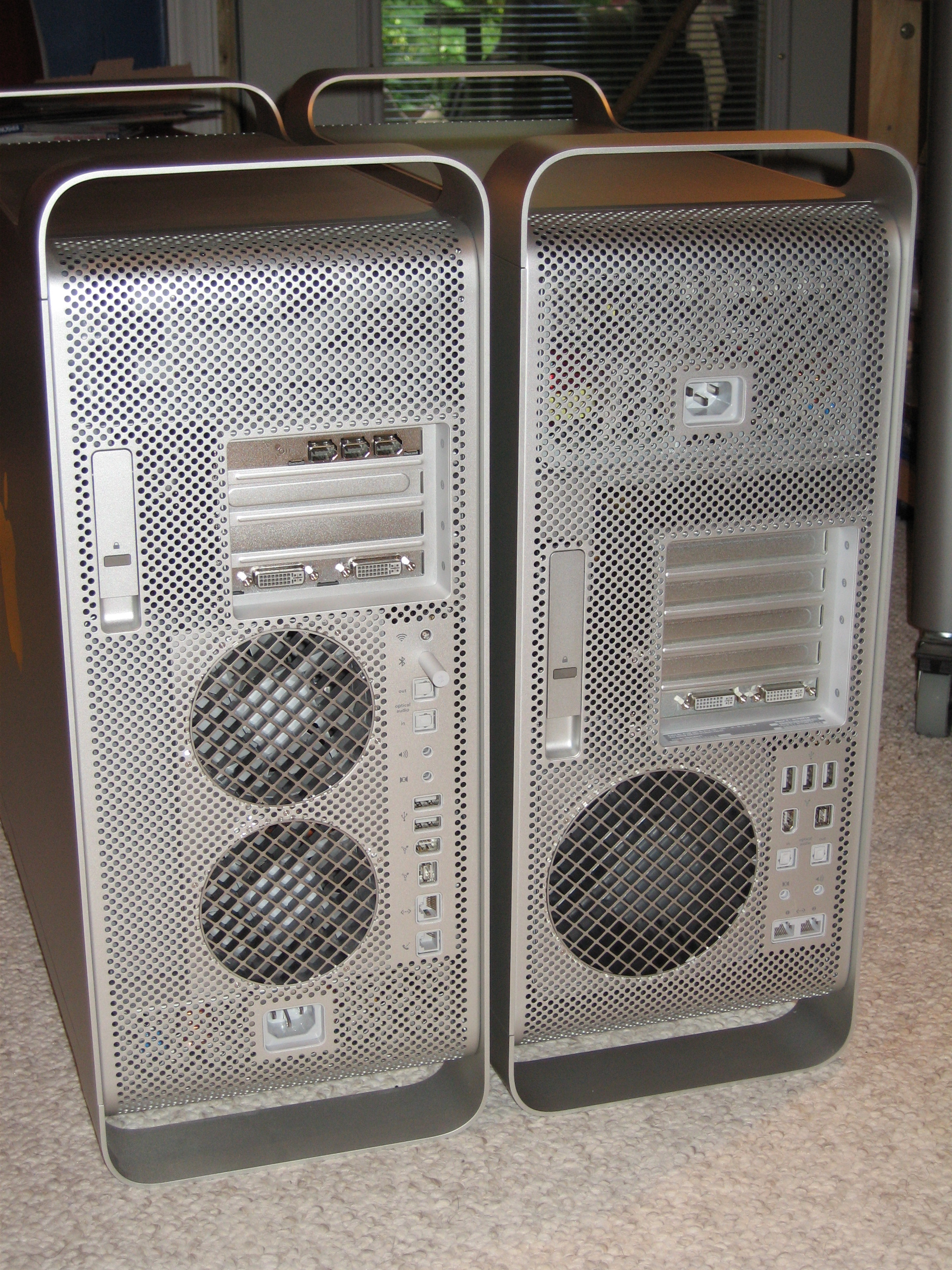
The backs of a Power Mac G5 (left) and a Mac Pro (right) show the differences in ports and fans

Apple announced their computers would transition from PowerPC processors to x86 processors in 2005. In June Apple released the Developer Transition Kit, a prototype Intel Pentium 4 Prescott–based Mac housed in a Power Mac G5 case, that was temporarily available to developers. The Mac Pro was formally announced on August 7, 2006, at the annual Apple Worldwide Developers Conference (WWDC), as the last Mac to transition to Intel processors.

The first generation of the Mac Pro featured an aluminium case that was derived from that of the Power Mac G5; the few external differences included a second optical drive bay, new I/O port configurations, and a rearranged power supply and fan arrangement in the rear of the machine. The case is the same external dimensions, but is two pounds lighter. Internally, the machines are very different. Without the hot G5 processor to cool, the interior has room for four 3.5-inch hard drive bays and two optical bays—two and one more, respectively, than the Power Mac G5. Each hard drive is attached via screws to a sled, that slides into place and requires no cables. Random access memory (RAM) was installed in eight fully-buffered memory module (DIMM) slots distributed across two riser cards. Each DIMM came with its own heat sink. The 2008 model had two PCI Express (PCIe) 2.0 expansion slots and two PCI Express 1.1 slots, providing them with up to 300 W of power in total. The first slot was double wide and intended to hold the main video card, arranged with an empty area the width of a normal card beside it to leave room for the large coolers modern cards often use. In most machines, one slot would be blocked by the cooler. Instead of the tiny screws typically used to fasten the cards to the case, in the Mac Pro a single "bar" held the cards in place, which is itself held in place by two "captive" thumbscrews that can be loosened by hand without tools and will not fall out of the case. On the original Mac Pro introduced in August 2006 and the April 2007 refresh, the PCIe slots can be configured individually to give more bandwidth to devices that require it, with a total of 40 "lanes", or 13 GB/s total throughput.

For external connectivity, the Mac Pro includes five USB 2.0 ports, two FireWire 400 and two FireWire 800 ports. Networking was supported with two built-in Gigabit Ethernet ports. Wi-Fi and Bluetooth support requires an optional module. Digital (TOSlink optical) audio and analog 3.5 mm stereo mini jacks for sound in and out were included, the latter becoming available on both the front and back of the case.

The Mac Pro initially shipped in a single configuration, with consumers able to customize the machine when ordering online. This "suggested configuration" had two 2.66 GHz dual-core Xeon "Woodcrest" 5100 processors (CPUs), 1 GB of fully-buffered DDR2 memory (RAM), a Nvidia GeForce 7300 GT graphics card (GPU), and a 250 GB hard drive. The processor could be downgraded to slower-frequency chips, or upgraded to Xeons running at 3 GHz. In 2007, the line was updated with a higher-end 3.0 GHz Xeon 8-core processor option initially exclusive to Apple.

In January 2008, Apple updated the Mac Pro. The new line featured quad-core Xeon "Harpertown" 5400 series CPUs as standard. Unlike the original Mac Pro, the 2008 revision could support two video cards running at x16 speeds, and locked the PCIe lane configurations. Bluetooth now came standard, and new video card options were offered.

A more substantial redesign of the Mac Pro came in 2009.

The Mac Pro line was updated in 2010 with "Westmere" Xeon processors. As the Xserve was discontinued, a Mac Pro Server model was also offered.

The Mac Pro line received a small update at the 2012 WWDC conference in June. The line received more default memory and increased processor speed but still used Intel's older Westmere processors instead of the newer Xeon E5 series. The line also lacked then-current technologies like SATA III, USB 3, and Thunderbolt, the last of which had been added to every other Macintosh at that point, and was criticized heavily by users, leading Apple to remove the "new" badge on the Mac Pro from the online store. An email from Apple CEO Tim Cook promised a more significant update to the line in 2013. Apple stopped shipping the Mac Pro in Europe on March 1, 2013 after an amendment to a safety regulation left the professional Mac non-compliant.

=== Reception ===
Ars Technica reviewed the 2006 Mac Pro, calling it a solid "multiplatform device" and rating it 9 out of 10. CNET praised the design and value, although did not think it provided the flexibility of other systems. They gave it an 8 out of 10.

Sound on Sound, an audio recording technology magazine, thought it was a "great machine" for musicians and audio engineers. Architosh, an online architectural design magazine focused on mac technology, would have scored it a perfect five except for a few issues with software compatibility and the high price for FB-DIMM memory.

=== Specifications ===
Model	Mid 2006	Early 2008	Early 2009		Mid 2010			Mid 2012		
Released	August 7, 2006; April 4, 2007	January 8, 2008	March 3, 2009; December 4, 2009		July 27, 2010			June 11, 2012		
Discontinued	January 8, 2008	March 3, 2009	July 27, 2010		June 11, 2012			October 22, 2013		
Order number	MA356	MA970	MB871	MB535	MC560	MC250	MC561	MD770	MD772 (Server)	MD771
Processor	Two 2.66 GHz 2-core Intel Xeon	Two 2.8 GHz 4-core Intel Xeon	One 2.66 GHz 4-core Intel Xeon	Two 2.26 GHz 4-core Intel Xeon	One 2.8 GHz 4-core Intel Xeon	Two 2.4 GHz 4-core Intel Xeon	Two 2.66 GHz 6-coreIntel Xeon	One 3.2 GHz 4-core Intel Xeon		Two 2.4 GHz 6-core Intel Xeon
Cache	4 MB L2	12 MB L2	8 MB L3			12 MB L3		8 MB L3		12 MB L3
Option	Configurable to 2.0 GHz, 2.66 GHz or 3.0 GHz 2-core or 3.0 GHz 4-core Xeon	Configurable to two 3.0 GHz or 3.2 GHz 4-core processors or one 2.8 GHz 4-core Xeon	Configurable to 2.93 GHz or 3.33 GHz 4-core Xeon processors or two 2.66 GHz or 2.93 GHz 4-core Xeon processors		Configurable to 3.2 GHz or 3.33 GHz 6-core Xeon processors or two 2.93 GHz 6-core Xeon processors			Configurable to 3.33 GHz 6-core Xeon, two 2.66 GHz 6-core Xeon or 2 3.06 GHz 6-core Xeon processors		
System bus	1333 MHz	1600 MHz	4.8 GT/s (4-core models only) or 6.4 GT/s		4.8 GT/s (4-core models only), 5.86 GT/s (8-core models only) or 6.4 GT/s			4.8 GT/s (4-core models only), 5.86 GT/s (12-core models only) or 6.4 GT/s		
Memory	1 GB 667 MHz DDR2 ECC FB-DIMM; Expandable to 16 GB	2 GB 800 MHz DDR2 ECC FB-DIMM; Expandable to 32 GB	3 GB 1066 MHz DDR3 ECC DIMM; Expandable to 16 GB	6 GB 1066 MHz DDR3 ECC DIMM; Expandable to 32 GB	3 GB 1066 or 1333 MHz ECC DDR3 SDRAM; Expandable to 32 GB	6 GB 1066 or 1333 MHz ECC DDR3 SDRAM; Expandable to 64 GB		6 GB 1066 or 1333 MHz ECC DDR3 SDRAM; Expandable to 32 GB	8 GB 1333 MHz ECC DDR3 SDRAM; Expandable to 32 GB	12 GB 1333 MHz ECC DDR3 SDRAM; Expandable to 64 GB
Graphics	Nvidia GeForce 7300 GT with 256 MB GDDR3 SDRAM; Optional ATI Radeon X1900 XT with 512 MB GDDR3 SDRAM or Nvidia Quadro FX 4500 with 512 MB GDDR3 SDRAM	ATI Radeon HD 2600 XT with 256 MB GDDR3 SDRAM (two dual-link DVI ports); Optional Nvidia GeForce 8800 GT with 512 MB GDDR3 SDRAM or Nvidia Quadro FX 5600 1.5 GB	Nvidia GeForce GT 120 with 512 MB GDDR3 SDRAM; Optional ATI Radeon HD 4870 with 512 MB GDDR5 SDRAM		ATI Radeon HD 5770 with 1 GB GDDR5 memory Optional ATI Radeon HD 5870 with 1 GB GDDR5 memory					
Storage	250 GB with 8 MB cache Optional 500 GB with 8 MB cache or 750 GB with 16 MB cache 7200-rpm SATA Hard drive	320 GB SATA with 8 MB cache Optional 500, 750 GB, or 1 TB SATA with 16 MB cache or 300 GB Serial Attached SCSI, 15,000-rpm with 16 MB cache 7200-rpm SATA Hard drive or 15k-rpm SAS hard drive	640 GB with 16 MB cache Optional 1 TB or 2 TB with 32 MB cache 7200-rpm SATA hard drive		1 TB SATA with 32 MB cache Optional 1 or 2 TB SATA with 32 MB cache or 256 or 512 GB solid-state drives 7200-rpm SATA hard drive or solid-state Drive					
Optical drive	16× SuperDrive with double-layer support (DVD±R DL/DVD±RW/CD-RW)		18× SuperDrive with double-layer support (DVD±R DL/DVD±RW/CD-RW)							
Connectivity	Optional Wi-Fi 4 (802.11a/b/g and draft-n, n disabled by default); 2× Gigabit Ethernet; Optional 56k V.92 USB modem Optional Bluetooth 2.0+EDR	Optional Wi-Fi 4 (802.11a/b/g and draft-n, n-enabled); 2× Gigabit Ethernet; Optional 56k V.92 USB modem Bluetooth 2.0+EDR	Wi-Fi 4 (802.11a/b/g/n); 2× Gigabit Ethernet; Bluetooth 2.1+EDR							
Peripherals	5× USB 2.0; 2× FireWire 400; 2× FireWire 800; Built-in mono speaker 1× Audio-in mini-jack 2× Audio-out mini-jack 1× Optical S/PDIF (Toslink) input 1× Optical S/PDIF (Toslink) output		5× USB 2.0; 4× FireWire 800; Built-in mono speaker 1× Audio-in mini-jack 2× Audio-out mini-jack 1× Optical S/PDIF (Toslink) input 1× Optical S/PDIF (Toslink) output							
Expansion slots	4× PCIe 1.0 slots (3 single-wide slots, 1 double-wide slot)	2× PCIe 1.1 single-wide 4x slots, 2× PCIe 2.0 16x slots (1 single-wide, 1 double-wide)	4× PCIe 2.0 slots (2 single-wide 4x slots, 1 single-wide 16x slot, 1 double-wide 16x slot)							
Dimensions	20.1 in (51.1 cm) height x 8.1 in (20.6 cm) width x 18.7 in (47.5 cm) depth									
Weight	42.4 lb (19.2 kg)		39.9 lb (18.1 kg) (quad-core); 41.2 lb (18.7 kg) (8-core)							
Initial operating system	Mac OS X 10.4 Tiger	Mac OS X 10.5 Leopard			Mac OS X 10.6 Snow Leopard			OS X 10.8 Mountain Lion		
Maximum operating system	Mac OS X 10.7 Lion if at least 2 GB RAM installed, otherwise Mac OS X 10.6 Snow Leopard	OS X 10.11 El Capitan			macOS 10.14 Mojave with a Metal-capable GPU, otherwise macOS 10.13 High Sierra					

== Cylindrical Mac Pro (2013) ==
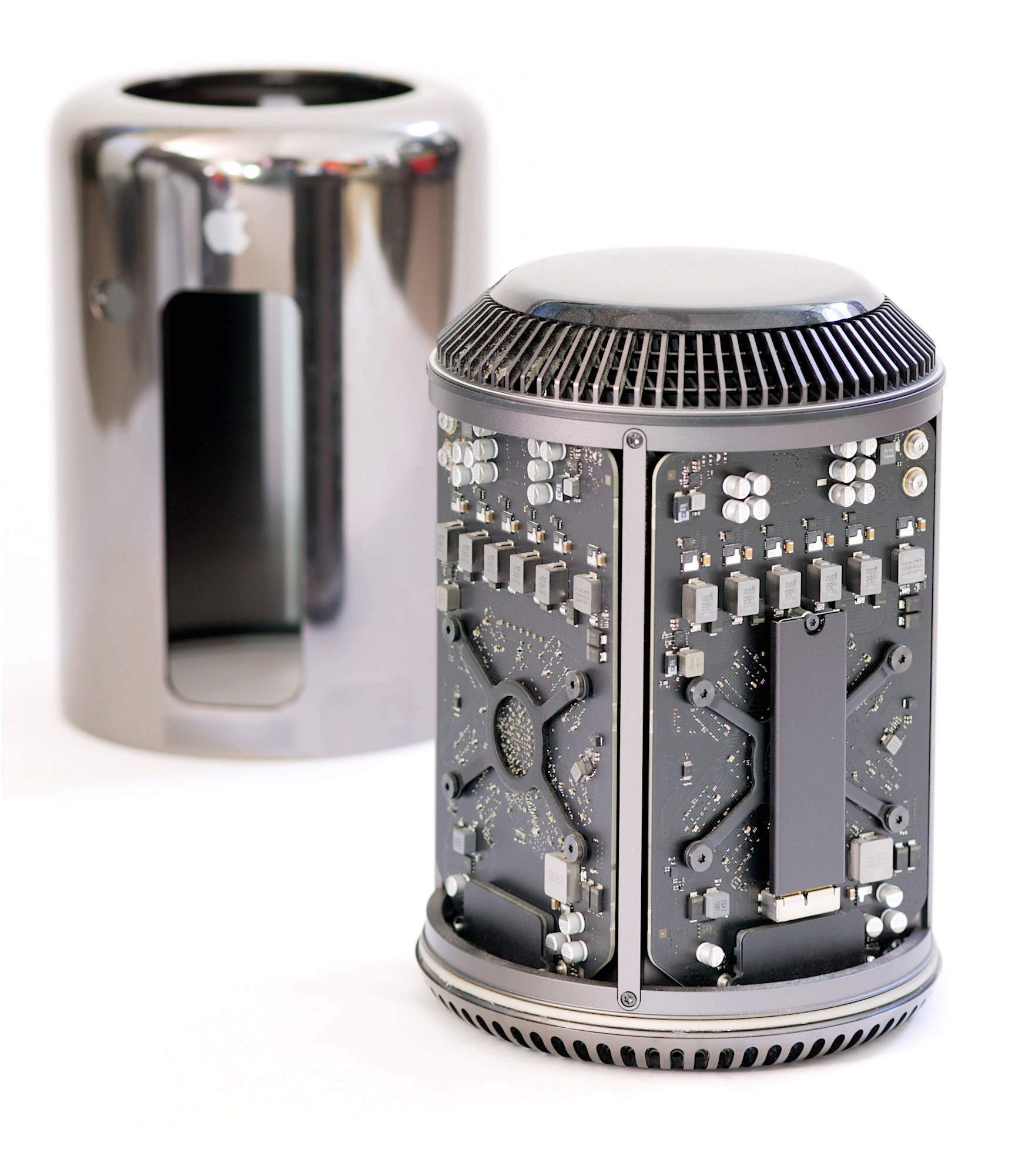
A 2013 Mac Pro, with its aluminium exterior removed

The minor 2012 update to the Mac Pro was received negatively, leading Apple to remove the "new" badge on the Apple Store denoting the update, and for Tim Cook to send an email to a customer promising Apple was "working on something really great for later next year." Apple senior vice president of marketing Phil Schiller presented a "sneak peek" of the completely redesigned Mac Pro during the 2013 Worldwide Developers Conference keynote. The video revealed an overhauled case design, featuring a cylindrical case much smaller than the previous Mac Pro. In the introduction, Schiller made reference to critics saying the company could not produce new products; "Can’t innovate anymore, my ass!" he quipped. The announcement six months prior to release was unusual for Apple, which typically announces products when they are ready for market.

The cylindrical Mac Pro is one-fourth the weight and one-eighth the volume of the previous tower model, with a diameter of 6.6 inches (17 cm) and height of 9.9 inches (25 cm). It supports one central processing unit (CPU) (up to a 12-core Xeon E5 CPU), four 1866 MHz DDR3 slots, dual AMD FirePro D series GPUs (up to D700 with 6 GB VRAM each), and PCIe-based flash storage. There is a 3× MIMO antenna system for the unit's 802.11ac WiFi networking interface, Bluetooth 4.0 to facilitate close-range wireless functions such as music transfer, keyboards, mice, tablets, speakers, security, cameras, and printers. The system can simultaneously support six Apple Thunderbolt Displays, or three 4K resolution computer monitors.

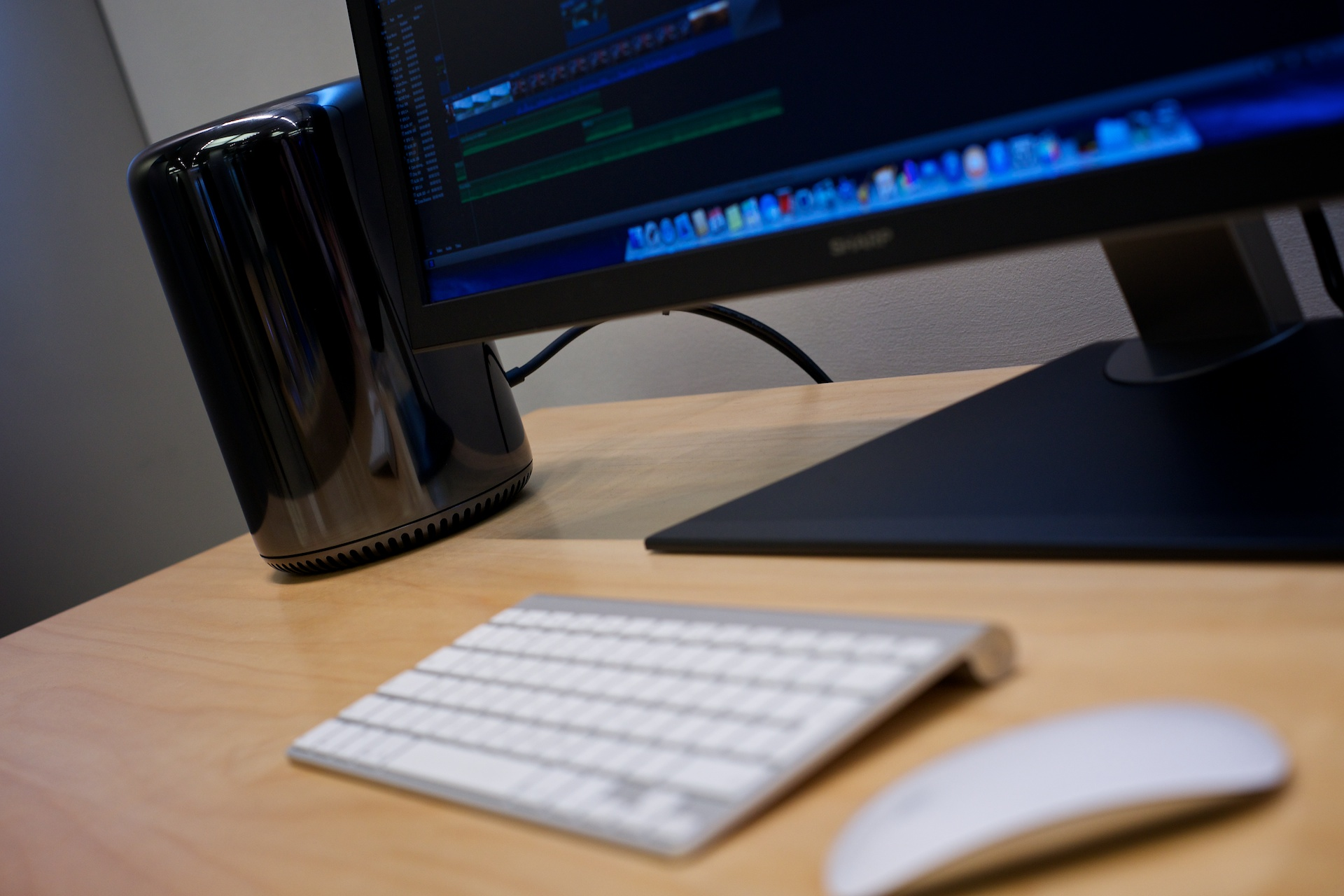
Cylindrical Mac Pro setup

The cylindrical Mac Pro has a redesigned configuration of ports. It has a HDMI 1.4 port, dual Gigabit Ethernet ports, six Thunderbolt 2 ports, four USB 3 ports, and combined digital Mini-TOSlink optical / analog 3.5 mm stereo mini jack for audio output. It also has a headphones mini jack (the two are distinctly selectable within the Sound System Preference panel, Output tab). There is no dedicated port for inputting audio. The system has a low-fidelity internal mono speaker. The Thunderbolt 2 ports support up to thirty-six Thunderbolt devices (six per port) and can concurrently support up to three 4K displays. This design requires two GPUs to support the seven display outputs (HDMI and six Thunderbolt). The I/O panel illuminates itself when the unit senses it has been moved to make it easier for the user to see the ports. Unlike the previous model, it has no FireWire 800 ports, dedicated digital audio in/out ports, a SuperDrive, DVI port, 3.5-inch drive bays for replaceable storage drives, or changeable internal PCIe slots. Instead, there are six Thunderbolt 2 ports to connect high-speed external peripherals, including enclosures for internal PCIe cards.

Apple's website mentions only RAM and flash storage as user-serviceable, though third party tear-downs show nearly all components can be removed and replaced. However, special tools only available from Apple are necessary for proper dismantling and reassembly. Apple has also specified mandatory and recommended tightening torque values for nearly every screw, with the most important being those securing the GPUs and CPU riser card to the thermal core. According to Apple, not tightening screws to the mandatory torque values may result in damage or malfunction. A lock switch on the aluminum housing allows for easy access to the internals, as well as fitting a security lock with its own cable, and components are secured with Torx screws. The flash storage and GPUs use proprietary connectors and are specially sized to fit into the enclosure. The CPU is not soldered to the riser card and can be replaced with another LGA 2011 socket processor, including processor options not offered by Apple. The type of RAM modules that Apple supplies with the late-2013 Mac Pro in the default configuration are ECC unbuffered (UDIMM) on the up to 8 GB modules (shown on each module as PC3-14900E). Apple offers as an optional upgrade 16 GB modules are ECC registered (RDIMM) modules (shown on each module as PC3-14900R). The higher-capacity 32 GB modules that some third-party vendors offer are also RDIMM. The UDIMM and RDIMM module types cannot be mixed. Apple publishes recommended configurations to use.

The model was assembled in Austin, Texas, by Apple's supplier Flextronics on a highly automated line. The move was made to counter American political complaints that it relied too heavily on outsourcing production; the Mac Pro, with its high margins and low production volumes was a low-risk model to produce domestically. The shift in production was described as a "fiasco" by one Apple engineer, as producing the cylinder's complicated design in America ultimately took Apple importing Chinese engineers from Foxconn.

The Mac Pro was released on December 19, 2013. It shipped in two stock configurations. The entry model featured a quad-core CPU, 12 GB of RAM, and dual AMD FirePro D300 GPUs. The higher-end model had a six-core CPU, 16 GB of RAM, and dual AMD FirePro D500 GPUs. Configuration options included 8- or 12-core CPUs, up to 64 GB of RAM, up to a 1 TB SSD, and dual AMD FirePro D700 GPUs. The Mac Pro did not ship with a keyboard or mouse.

=== Reception ===
Reception of the cylindrical Mac Pro was mixed, initially receiving positive reviews, but more negative in the long term, due to Apple's failure to upgrade the hardware specs. The performance had been widely lauded, especially handling video tasks on the dual GPU units, with some reviewers noting the ability to apply dozens of filters to realtime 4K resolution video in Final Cut Pro X. Drive performance, connected via PCIe, was also widely mentioned as a strong point. Technical reviewers praised the OpenCL API under which the machine's powerful twin GPUs and its multi-core CPU can be treated as a single pool of computing power. However, in late 2013 through early 2014, some reviewers had noted the lack of internal expandability, second CPU, serviceability, and questioned the then-limited offerings via Thunderbolt 2 ports. By 2016, reviewers started to agree that the Mac Pro was now lacking in functionality and power, it having not been updated since 2013, and it was past time for Apple to update it. Apple later revealed in 2017 that the thermal core design had limited the ability to upgrade the Mac Pro's GPUs and that a new design was under development, to be released sometime after 2017.

Sales for the new Mac Pro disappointed, and Apple quickly slashed production. Apple employees called it "the failed trash can"

On February 5, 2016, Apple identified problems with FirePro D500 and D700 GPUs manufactured between February 8, 2015 and April 11, 2015. Issues included "distorted video, no video, system instability, freezing, restarts, shut downs, or may prevent system start up." Customers who owned a Mac Pro exhibiting those issues could take their affected machine to Apple or an authorized service provider to have both GPUs replaced for free. The repair program ended on May 30, 2018. Customers who owned Mac Pros with FirePro D300 GPUs also complained about problems, but those GPUs were not included in the repair program until July 2018. Customers with FirePro GPUs not manufactured between those dates have complained of issues including overheating and thermal throttling. It is believed Apple has not enabled a satisfactory cooling fan profile in order to properly remove heat from the system. Users have had to resort to using third-party apps to manually increase the fan speed to prevent the GPUs from overheating.

The Mac Pro was left unchanged for over three years, leading Apple to make a rare admission of a product's failure in April 2017 when it detailed the issues surrounding the design and promised a totally redesigned Mac Pro. The design of the cylindrical Mac Pro has received mixed reviews, and has been compared to a trash can, rice cooker, Curta mechanical calculator, R2-D2, or Darth Vader's helmet. On September 18, 2018, the Mac Pro surpassed the Macintosh Plus's production life record for an unchanged Mac model, with the Plus having remained on sale unchanged for 1,734 days. It was discontinued on December 10, 2019, after being on sale unchanged for a record 2,182 days.

=== Specifications ===
Model	Late 2013		
Announced	June 10, 2013		
Released	December 19, 2013		
Discontinued	April 4, 2017	December 10, 2019	
Processor (LGA 2011)	3.7 GHz 4-core Intel Xeon E5 with 10 MB L3 cache Configurable to 3.5 GHz 6-core Xeon E5 with 12 MB L3 cache, 3.0 GHz 8-core Xeon E5 with 25 MB L3 cache, or 2.7 GHz 12-core Xeon E5 with 30 MB L3 cache	3.5 GHz 6-core Intel Xeon E5 with 12 MB L3 cache Configurable to 3.0 GHz 8-core Xeon E5 with 25 MB L3 cache or 2.7 GHz 12-core Xeon E5 with 30 MB L3 cache	3.0 GHz 8-core Intel Xeon E5 with 25 MB L3 cache Configurable to 2.7 GHz 12-core Xeon E5 with 30 MB L3 cache
Memory	12 GB of DDR3 ECC at 1866 MHz Configurable up to 64 GB	16 GB of DDR3 ECC 1866 MHz Configurable up to 64 GB	12 GB of DDR3 ECC 1866 MHz; Configurable up to 64 GB from Apple, expandable to 128 GB using third-party modules
Graphics	Dual AMD FirePro D300 with 2 GB of GDDR5 VRAM each	Dual AMD FirePro D500 with 3 GB of GDDR5 VRAM each	Dual AMD FirePro D700 with 6 GB of GDDR5 VRAM each
Storage	256 GB flash storage Optional 512 GB or 1 TB flash storage PCIe SSD		
Connectivity	Built-in Wi-Fi 5 (802.11a/b/g/n/ac), up to 1.3 Gbit/s; 2× Gigabit Ethernet; Bluetooth 4.0		
Peripherals	4× USB 3.0; 6× Thunderbolt 2 HDMI 1.4; Built-in mono speaker Audio output/optical digital audio output Headphone mini-jack		
Dimensions	9.9 in (25.1 cm) height × 6.6 in (16.8 cm) diameter		
Weight	11 lb (4.99 kg)		
Initial operating system	OS X 10.9 Mavericks		
Maximum operating system	macOS 12 Monterey		

== Lattice tower or rack (2019) ==
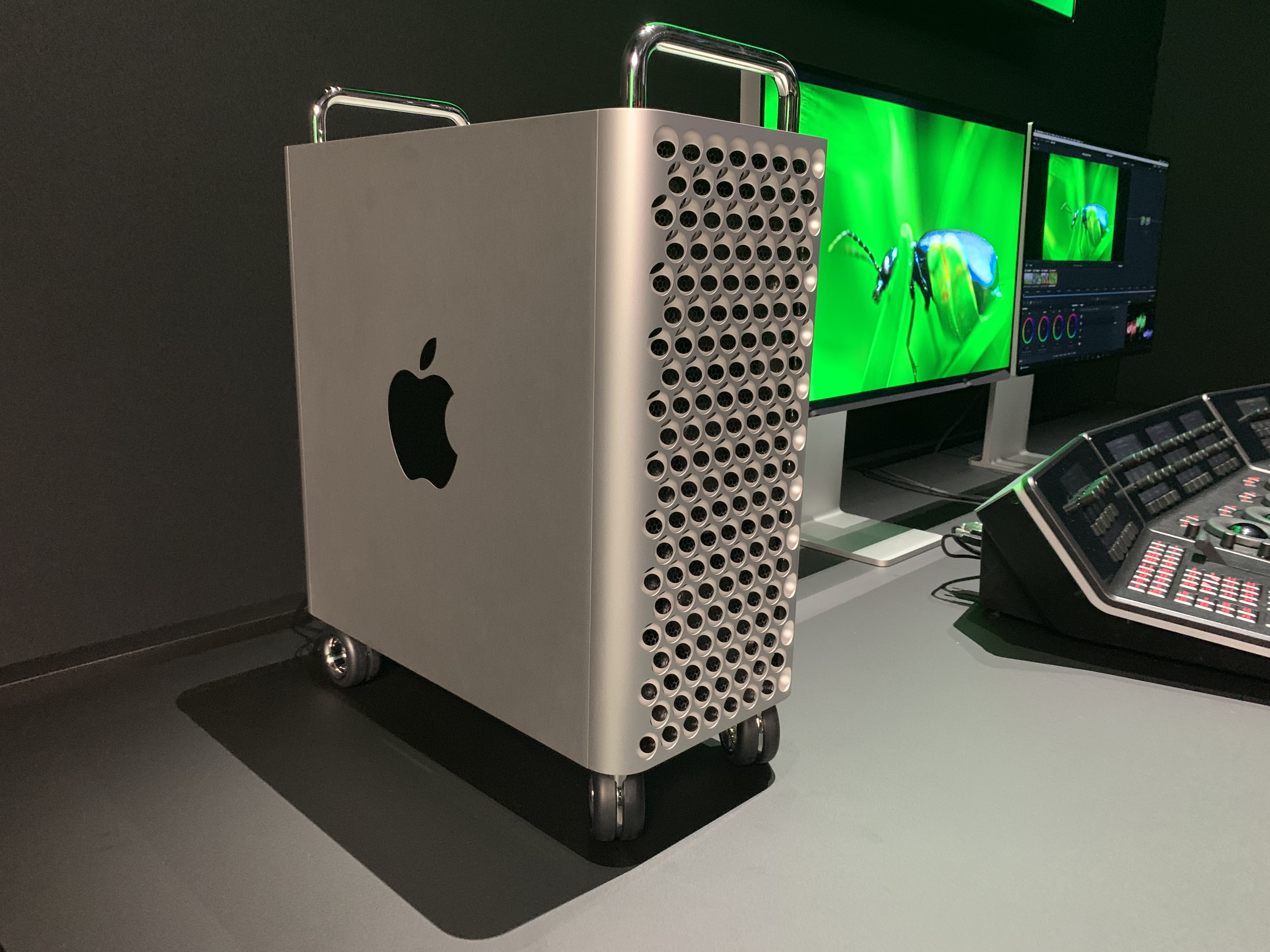
Mac Pro (2019) with wheels

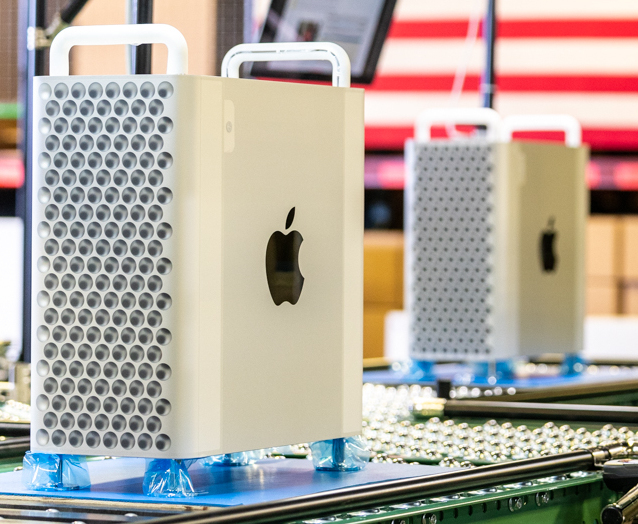
The Mac Pro (2019) on assembly line

In April 2018, Apple confirmed that a redesigned Mac Pro would be released in 2019 to replace the 2013 model. Apple announced this new Mac Pro on June 3, 2019 at the Worldwide Developers Conference. It returns to a tower design similar to the original Mac Pro models. The design also includes a new thermal architecture with three impeller fans, which promises to prevent the computer from having to throttle the processor so that it can always run at its peak performance level. The RAM is expandable to 1.5 TB using twelve 128 GB DIMMs. It can be configured with up to two AMD Radeon Pro GPUs, based on RDNA architecture, which come in a custom MPX module, which are fanless and use the chassis's cooling system. Apple's Afterburner card is a custom add-on, which adds hardware acceleration for ProRes codecs. Similar to the second generation, the cover can be removed to access the internals, which features eight PCIe 3.0 slots for expansion, making this the first Mac with six or more expansion slots since the Power Macintosh 9600 in 1997. It can also be purchased with wheels and in a rack mount configuration. Feet and wheels are not stated by Apple to be user-replaceable and require sending the machine to an Apple Store or authorized service provider, though teardowns show the feet are simply screwed on. It was announced alongside the Pro Display XDR, a 6K display with the same finish and lattice pattern.

The 2019 Mac Pro is capable of lights-out management.

After initial reports that the Mac Pro would be assembled in China, Apple confirmed in September 2019 it would be assembled in Austin, Texas, at the same facility as the previous-generation Mac Pro, making it the sole Apple product assembled in the United States. The production was the subject of a tariff dispute with US president Donald Trump in late 2019. Trump toured the Mac Pro assembly line in November 2019.

Radeon Pro W5700X and W5500X graphics cards were added as options in April and July 2020, respectively. In August 2021, options for RDNA 2–based Radeon Pro cards (W6800X, W6800X Duo and W6900X) were added. In March 2022, Apple upgraded the base model configuration with the Radeon Pro W5500X and 512 GB SSD, replacing the Radeon Pro 580X graphics and 256 GB SSD previously offered.

The 2019 Mac Pro was discontinued in June 2023 following the announcement of the Apple silicon Mac Pro. The 2019 Mac Pro was the last Intel-based Mac sold by Apple.

=== Design ===
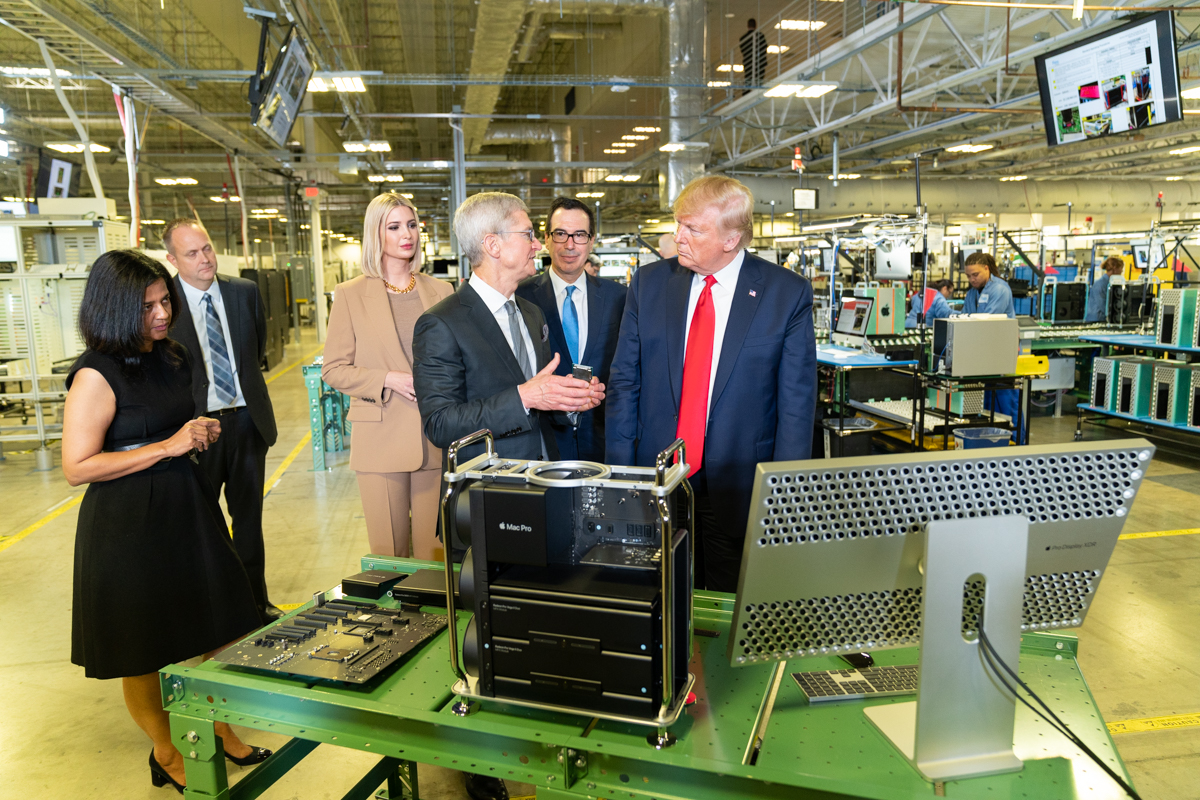
An opened Mac Pro and Pro Display XDR are shown by Apple CEO Tim Cook to U.S. president Donald Trump in 2019.

The 2019 Mac Pro returns to a tower form factor and features a prominent lattice pattern on its front and rear. The lattice design was purportedly originally developed by Jony Ive for the Power Mac G4 Cube in 2000. It comes bundled with a new Magic Keyboard with black keys in a silver chassis, and a black Magic Mouse 2 or Magic Trackpad 2 with a silver underside.

=== Reception ===
Initial reviews were generally positive. The only pre-release review models of the Mac Pro and Pro Display XDR were provided to YouTube tech vloggers Justine Ezarik, Marques Brownlee, and Jonathan Morrison, rather than reviewers from traditional news outlets.

iFixit gave it a repairability score of 9/10, noting that every part of the machine is user-replaceable. The SSD can also be replaced via Apple official parts, but require an Apple Configurator restore to re-pair it with the T2 chip.

=== Specifications ===
Model	2019	
Released	December 10, 2019	
Model numbers	A1991 (Desktop), A2304 (Rack Mount)	
Processor	3.5 GHz 8-core Intel Xeon W with 24.5 MB cache 3.3 GHz 12-core Xeon W with 31.2 MB cache 3.2 GHz 16-core Xeon W with 38 MB cache	2.7 GHz 24-core Xeon W with 57 MB cache 2.5 GHz 28-core Xeon W with 66.5 MB cache
Memory	32 GB DDR4 ECC RAM; Expandable to 768 GB	32 GB DDR4 ECC RAM; Expandable to 1.5 TB
Graphics	AMD Radeon Pro W5500X with 8 GB of GDDR6 memory (available July 2020, standard since March 2022); Radeon Pro 580X with 8 GB of GDDR5 memory (discontinued March 2022); Single or dual Radeon Pro W5700X with 16/32 GB of GDDR6 memory (Available April 2020); Single or dual Radeon Pro Vega II with 32/64 GB of HBM2 memory Single or dual Radeon Pro Vega II Duo with 64/128 GB of HBM2 memory Radeon Pro W6600X with 8 GB of GDDR6 memory (available March 2022); Single or dual Radeon Pro W6800X with 32/64 GB of GDDR6 memory (available August 2021); Single or dual Radeon Pro W6800X Duo with 64/128 GB of GDDR6 memory (available August 2021); Single or dual Radeon Pro W6900X with 32/64 GB of GDDR6 memory (available August 2021)	
Storage	256 GB (before March 2022); 512 GB; Configurable up to 8 TB	
Networking	Built-in Wi-Fi 5 (802.11a/b/g/n/ac), up to 1.3 Gbit/s; 2× 10 Gigabit Ethernet with Lights Out Management; Bluetooth 5.0	
Peripherals	Thunderbolt 3 (USB-C 3.1 Gen 2) supporting DisplayPort; 2× top of case, 2× rear I/O card (all models); Additional 4× rear (single W5700X, Vega II/Vega II Duo) or 8× rear (dual W5700X, Vega II/Vega II Duo) 3× USB-A 3.0 (2× rear I/O card, 1× inside case)	
Expansion slots	8× PCIe 3.0 slots (3 double-wide x16 slots, 1 double-wide x8 slot, 1 single-wide x16 slot, 2 x8 single-wide slots, 1 half-length x4 slot preloaded with I/O card on all models)	
Audio	3.5 mm headphone jack, Built-in mono speaker	
Dimensions	20.8 in (52.9 cm) height x 8.6 in (21.8 cm) width x 17.7 in (45 cm) depth 8.67 in (22.0 cm) or 5U height x 19.0 in (48.2 cm) width x 21.2 in (54 cm) depth (rack mount)	
Weight	39.7 lb (18 kg)	
Initial operating system	macOS 10.15 Catalina	
Maximum operating system	macOS 26 Tahoe	

== Apple silicon (2023) ==
On June 5, 2023, Apple announced the only Mac Pro model with an Apple silicon chip, based on the Apple M2 Ultra chip that was also featured in the highest-end second-generation Mac Studio. Externally, the M2 Ultra Mac Pro uses the same chassis as the 2019 Intel model. Internally, it features a redesigned Apple silicon logic board that includes six internal PCIe 4.0 slots for expansion. It does not support discrete GPUs over PCIe. The internal SSD is upgradeable, but the GPU and memory are not. According to Bloomberg's Mark Gurman, Apple developed a chip for the Mac Pro combining two M2 Ultra chips into one package but cancelled it because of cost and manufacturing concerns.

=== Reception ===
The Verge's review of the Mac Pro praised its performance, saying it "vastly outperforms Intel models from 2019," but criticized the inability to upgrade memory and the lack of support for graphics cards. It also criticized the Mac Pro's $3,000 (+75%) price premium over a similarly configured Mac Studio with the same performance, with the Mac Pro's only advantage being the addition of PCIe slots and better cooling.

YouTuber Marques Brownlee found the Mac Pro and Mac Studio performed almost identically in testing despite the Mac Pro's much larger cooling system in his video "Why Does the M2 Mac Pro Exist?".

=== Specifications ===
Model	2023
Chip	24-core Apple M2 Ultra; 60-core GPU; 32-core Neural Engine; Configurable to M2 Ultra with 24-core CPU, 76-core GPU, and 32-core Neural Engine
Memory	64 GB unified memory Configurable to 128 or 192 GB
Storage	1 TB SSD; Configurable up to 8 TB
Networking	Wi-Fi 6E; Bluetooth 5.3; 2× 10GbE
Peripherals	8× Thunderbolt 4 (USB-C) ports 2× USB-A ports 2x HDMI; 3.5 mm headphone jack 1× USB-A port and 2× SATA ports (internal)
Expansion slots	6× full-length PCIe Gen 4 slots 1× half-length PCIe Gen 3 slot with Apple I/O card installed
Dimensions	20.8×8.58×17.7 inches (52.8×21.8×45.0 cm)
Weight	37.2 pounds (16.9 kg)
Greenhouse gas emissions	1572 kg CO_{2}e (1 TB storage)

== Mac Pro Server ==
On November 5, 2010, Apple introduced the Mac Pro Server, which officially replaced the Xserve line of Apple servers as of January 31, 2011. The Mac Pro Server includes an unlimited Mac OS X Server license and an Intel Xeon 2.8 GHz quad-core processor, with 8 GB of DDR3 RAM. In mid-2012, the Mac Pro Server was upgraded to an Intel Xeon 3.2 GHz quad-core processor. The Mac Pro Server was discontinued on October 22, 2013, with the introduction of the cylindrical Mac Pro. However, the OS X Server software package could be purchased from the Mac App Store. The server software package was discontinued on April 21, 2022 and macOS Monterey was the last version to support this. The redesigned Mac Pro released on December 10, 2019 has a rack-mount version, available in the same configurations as the standard Mac Pro for a $500 premium. The rack-mounted Mac Pro comes with mounting rails to mount it in a server rack, and fits in a 5 Rack Unit (or "U") space. The Apple silicon Mac Pro also comes in a rack version.

== Discontinuation ==
On March 5, 2025, Apple announced new Mac Studio models with M4 Max and M3 Ultra chips. The Mac Pro did not receive an update, and in November 2025, reports circulated that Apple had cancelled plans for an M4 Ultra chip for the Mac Pro, and had "largely written off" the product. Apple discontinued the Mac Pro on March 26, 2026, saying that they had no plans to replace the product, leaving the Mac Studio the highest-end desktop model offered.

Many publications considered the discontinuation of the product a long time coming, with the pivot to Apple silicon removing the opportunity for the product to differentiate itself.

Podcaster and developer Marco Arment said that amid a shrinking demand for large desktops, Apple further shrunk the market for the Mac Pro by making it more expensive and serving fewer types of users. Arment and his fellow podcast host John Siracusa agreed that the last good Mac Pros were Intel-based.

== See also ==
- Dell Precision
- Fujitsu Celsius
- HP Z
- Lenovo ThinkStation

Timeline of Mac Pro and Mac Studio models
See also: List of Mac models
