= Madplayer =

Madplayer was a portable music device that started selling in 2001. It was conceived by Alain Georges (a.k.a. Doctor Mad) and a group of engineers and musicians who started to work on it in 1998.

As opposed to other devices and/or software pieces in the same application field, the music composing technology behind the MadPlayer was not loop-based but rather composed of multiple layers of algorithms that eventually generated each note for each instrument, chosen on the basis of music genre definitions. An embedded synthesizer technology was in charge of producing the music based on the generated score.

According to Alain Georges, "the name 'MadPlayer' came from the fact that the 'songs' that were created from scratch by the technology were based on algorithms (rules) uniquely dependent on the music genre that a user picked, and at some point of experimentation [it was] decided just for fun to create a new 'music genre' that would mix all the algorithms from all the styles. [As can be guessed], this could yield to pretty wild results, and sometimes sounded like they had been composed by a mad man. I thus called this genre the 'Mad' style, and quickly found the commercial name for the composing device: the 'MadPlayer'."

The device used SmartMedia memory cards from which it could play a number of different audio media types such as MP3, MIDI and KAR karaoke/MIDI files. Its feature list included:

- Infinite music composer
- MP3/WAV/WMA/MIDI file player
- MIDI synthesizer/expander
- MIDI/Audio mixer
- real-time voice input mixing (with effects)
- karaoke player (displaying lyrics in real time)
- sound recorder
- internal + external flash memory
- USB interface
- analog audio input/output
- digital audio output
- FM radio
- firmware upgradable with new music genres, features, algorithms, ...

Madplayer won a number of awards and was highly regarded for its inventive design, powerful tools, and quality of included sequences, but was also regarded as confusing to use.

According to Alain Georges, a non-exhaustive list of awards included:

- Finalist, Best New Product, and Best Product Development Team, 2004 International Business Awards
- Finalist, Best New Product, 2003 American Business Awards
- CES 2002 Innovation Award Honoree
- Apple Expo, Paris – 2002 – Best of Show
- Most Innovative Product of Show 2001, Mainstream Audio Tech TV

The device originally sold for $200 but dropped in price to $100 by some retailers like Fry's/Outpost.
