= Stevenote =

Keynote speeches given by Steve Jobs

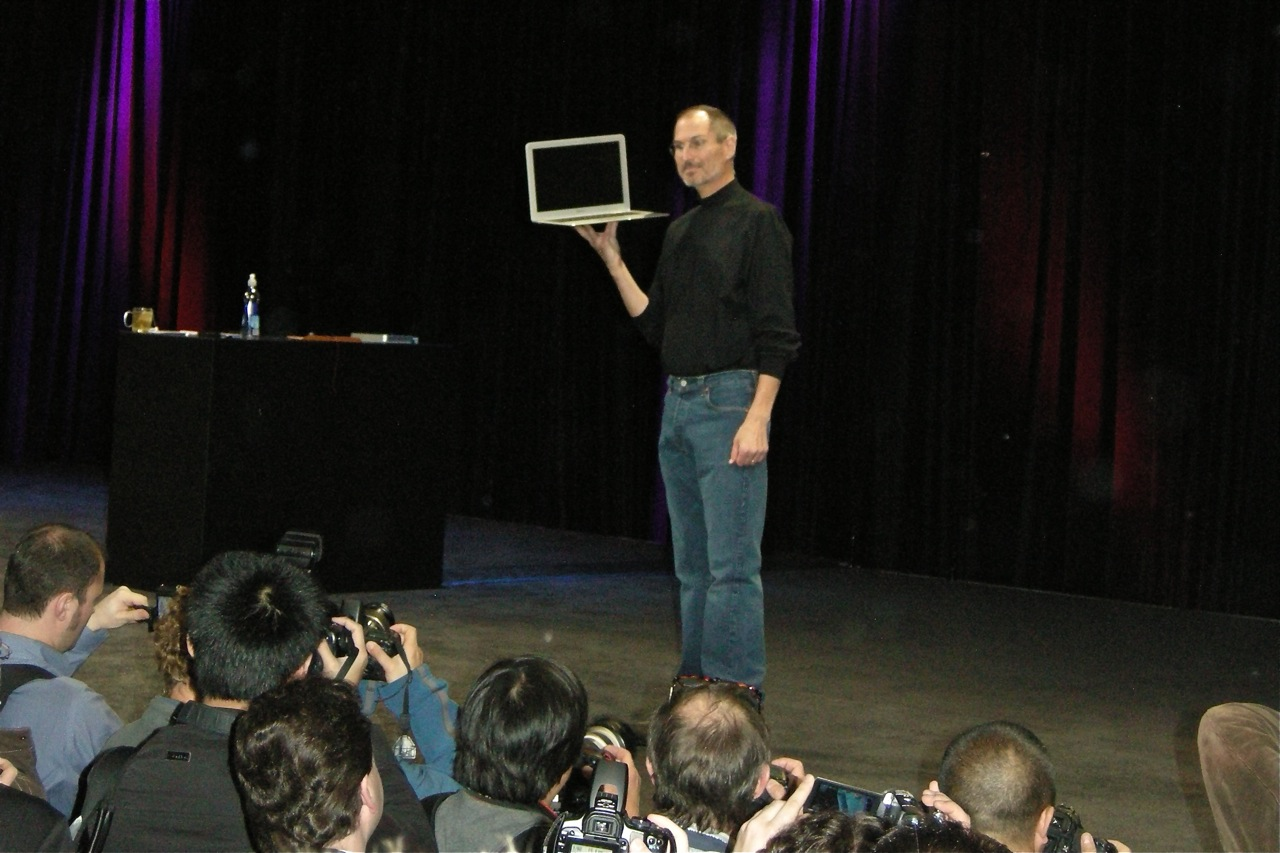
Steve Jobs introduces MacBook Air during keynote presentation at Macworld 2008. The event was his last Macworld appearance.

Stevenote is a colloquial term for keynote speeches given by Steve Jobs, former CEO of Apple, at events such as the Apple Worldwide Developers Conference, Macworld Expo, and Apple Expo. Because most Apple product releases were first shown to the public at these keynotes, "Stevenotes" caused substantial swings in Apple's stock price.

The final Stevenote was delivered on June 6, 2011, when iCloud (Apple's cloud computing service) was announced. OS X Lion and iOS 5 were also announced on the same day. It was one of Jobs' last public appearances before his resignation as CEO on August 24 and his death on October 5 of that year.

== History ==
In late 1996, Apple purchased NeXT, and Jobs returned to Apple after an 11-year hiatus following his forced resignation from the company in 1985. In mid-1997, he delivered a keynote address, with a detailed report on the company's status, featuring a satellite appearance by Microsoft CEO Bill Gates. Jobs announced a partnership with Microsoft with several key agreements which, according to him, would benefit Apple and allow it to recover from the prolonged decline of the early and mid-1990s. Two major announcements were made during the keynote: the next release of Microsoft Office (Office 98) would be developed for the Macintosh, and Microsoft's Internet Explorer would be the default web browser on Macintosh computers. Despite heckling from the audience, Jobs explained why the partnership was favorable to Apple:

The era of setting this up as a competition between Apple and Microsoft is over, as far as I'm concerned. This is about getting Apple healthy, and this is about Apple being able to make incredibly great contributions to the industry to get healthy and prosper again.

— Steve Jobs, MacWorld Boston 1997 – Steve Jobs returns – Bill Gates appears on-screen, Mac History (6 August 1997), Christoph Dernbach

Jobs later gave keynote addresses at trade expositions and conferences at least once a year, in which he announced updates to Apple products or demonstrated new products and services. Nearly every product upgrade or announcement in the next 13 years was made during a Stevenote. Among products so-announced were the original iMac all-in-one desktop computer in 1998, the clamshell iBook in 1999, the Mac OS X operating system in 2000, the iPod music player in 2001, the iPhone smartphone in 2007, and the iPad tablet in 2010.

== Format ==
Stevenote addresses have usually been given at major trade expos. In the past, these have included the Macworld Conference & Expo in San Francisco and Boston, and the Apple Expo in Paris. However, Apple has stopped exhibiting at both expos. After 2010, the Worldwide Developers Conference, organized and held by Apple itself at the Moscone Center in San Francisco, was the only major conference at which Apple exhibited and at which Jobs delivered a keynote address. In recent years, Jobs gave his Stevenotes in an auditorium at Apple's corporate campus. These Stevenotes, in contrast to those presented at the large trade fairs attended by Apple in the past, were by invitation only and were attended only by a relatively small number of journalists, employees, and guests, and were called "special events" rather than keynotes. Similar Stevenotes have also been held at the Yerba Buena Center for the Arts like those for the introduction of the iPad in 2010 and Apple's "Rock and Roll" iPod event in 2009.

Jobs was known for donning the same uniform in nearly every keynote since 1998. His outfit usually consisted of a black long-sleeved mock turtleneck by Issey Miyake, Levi's 501 blue jeans, and New Balance 991 sneakers.

== Notable Stevenotes ==
=== 1998 ===
At the 1998 Apple Worldwide Developers Conference (WWDC) keynote, Jobs announced that the company was back on track. He reviewed Apple's inventory turnover rate, describing changes in its distribution system and apple.com, its online store. Jobs said that Apple had sold 500,000 Power Macintosh G3 in its first six months, described the PowerBook G3 and showed the "Steamroller" commercial. He claimed that there were 10 million Apple computers in consumer use and six million educational users, and discussed the iMac and QuickTime; Jobs said that the International Organization for Standardization adopted the QuickTime file format as the basis for MPEG 4. Jobs said that Apple would add Internet "live" streaming (Real-time Transport Protocol) to QuickTime 3.0 for its release in fall 1998 and introduced Peter Hoddie, chief architect of QuickTime. Jobs described three improvements Apple wanted to make to Java: unify the Java virtual machine, make it compatible and make it fast. He announced Apple's strategy for Mac OS X, saying that the 6,000-plus good application programming interfaces (APIs) would be called Carbon (API), introducing Avadis Tevanian to demonstrate Carbon. Tevanian introduced Ben Waldman (general manager of the Macintosh unit at Microsoft), Norm Meyrowitz (president of Macromedia Products) and Greg Gilley (vice-president for graphics applications development at Adobe Systems), who demonstrated Photoshop. Jobs announced that the Mac OS 8 Codename Sonata would be released in the third quarter of 1999; Rhapsody 1.0 would be released in the third quarter of 1998.

=== 1999 ===
WWDC 1999 was opened by HAL9000. Jobs delivered an update, saying that 3,106 Mac apps were announced since May 6, 1998 (the debut date of iMac); Dragon Systems was bringing its voice-recognition software to the Mac, and he introduced Janet Baker (co-founder and CEO of Dragon Systems). Jobs updated Apple's profits, units, inventory and cash, announcing that Sears would be added to its national distribution chain. Apple Inc. launched its store on Memorial Day 1999, and Jobs announced the PowerBook line. During the one-week conference, Apple gave away 50 PowerBooks to attending developers. Jobs delivered an update on OpenGL, Java and QuickTime, inviting Avie Tevanian and Phil Schiller onstage. Schiller demonstrated OpenGL, QuickTime 4, Sherlock 2, the Quartz graphics model, Finder and the MailViewer app. Jobs announced Java MRJ 2.1.2, the fastest Mac Java to date, and he and Tevanian demonstrated Java. He reviewed Mac OS 8.5 (released in October 1998), announced Mac OS 8.6, previewed Sonata (scheduled for release in fall 1999) and delivered an update on Mac OS X Server 1.0. Jobs said that in the Darwin open-source software program there were over 20,000 registered developers and over 175,000 component downloads, describing the three application environments on the Darwin-Quartz foundation. The first was Classic Environment (formerly named Blue Box); the second was Carbon (API) (announced at WWDC 1998), and the third was Cocoa (API) (formerly named Yellow Box). Apple was developing a new Finder and a new Mail.

At the August 31, 1999, Seybold Seminars Expo, Jobs delivered an update on Apple, announcing its June quarterly profits, the appointment of Mickey Drexler (of Gap Inc.) to the board of directors, and giving an overview of QuickTime. Apple partnered with Akamai Technologies as a broadcast network, with content provided by BBC News, Bloomberg Television, Fox News, Fox Sports, HBO, NPR, The Weather Channel, WGBH-TV, ABC News, ESPN, Rolling Stone, VH1, and Disney; new content was provided by Rhino Records and Warner Bros. Records. Phil Schiller demonstrated QuickTime TV, Sherlock 2, VoicePrint, AppleScript and the Power Mac G4, and Jobs previewed Mac OS 9. He demonstrated nine features: Sherlock 2, a shopping app; Multiple Users, with privacy and preferences for a number of users; VoicePrint Password, voice-recognition software; Keychain, with one password; Auto Updating, for the latest updates; Encryption, for private files; File Sharing Over Internet; AppleScript over TCP/IP, to manage workflow across computers, and Network Browser. Jobs reviewed the iMac, introducing Ozzie Osborne (general manager of speech systems at IBM) to demonstrate ViaVoice. Jobs reviewed iBook (showing two TV advertisements) AirPort (showing the AirPort Base Station TV ad), the PowerBook and the Power Mac G4, calling computer scientist Richard Crandall onstage to demonstrate the G4. Jobs introduced John Warnock, chairman and chief commercial officer (CCO) of Adobe Systems. Jobs showed a Power Mac G4 TV ad, and introduced the Apple Cinema Display.

On October 5, 1999, Jobs said that Akio Morita of Sony had died two days earlier, announced the Mac OS 9 and described the nine internet power tools. Phil Schiller demonstrated Sherlock 2, Multiple Users, VoicePrint Password, Keychain, Encryption, Network Browser and Auto Updating. Jobs reviewed the Power Mac G4, showed a TV ad, and reviewed the Apple Cinema Display, PowerBook, and iBook. He announced the new iMac, and Schiller demonstrated the graphics card. Jobs introduced and demonstrated the iMac DV and iMovie, and showed three TV commercials.

== Product introductions ==
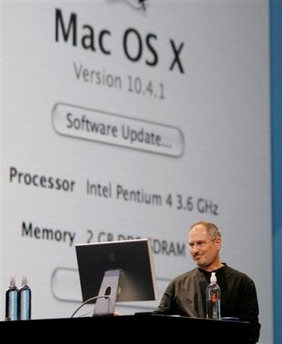
Jobs showing Mac OS X running on an Intel processor for the first time

- 1984: Macintosh
- 1996: Announced return to Apple
- 1997: Power Macintosh G3 and PowerBook G3
- 1998: iMac
- 1999: New Power Mac G3 and G4, iBook, QuickTime TV and AirPort Wi-Fi connectivity
- 2000: Mac OS X (now known as macOS), Power Mac G4 Cube and PowerBook G4
- 2001: Launch of Mac OS X, iTunes, iPod and new iBook G3
- 2002: Mac OS X Jaguar and the discontinuation of Mac OS 9, the last Classic Mac OS
- 2003: Xcode and iTunes Music Store
- 2004: iPod Mini and Mac OS X Tiger
- 2005: Mac Mini, iPod Shuffle, iPod Nano, and the Mac transition from PowerPC to Intel processors was announced
- 2006: The first Intel-based Apple computer, the iMac Core Duo and the MacBook Pro
- 2007: Apple TV, iPhone, iPod Touch, iPhone OS and launch of Mac OS X Leopard
- 2008: MacBook Air, iPhone 3G, and second-generation aluminum 13-inch MacBook and 15-inch MacBook Pro
- 2009: iPhone 3GS and Mac OS X Snow Leopard
- 2010: iPad, iPhone 4, and next-generation MacBook Air
- 2011: iPad 2, Mac OS X Lion, iOS 5 and iCloud. iPhone 4S with Siri were presented in the first keynote by Tim Cook as CEO, the day before Jobs' death.

Notable keynotes after Jobs' death:

- 2012: MacBook Pro with Retina Display, iPhone 5, next-generation Mac Mini, next-generation iMac, iPad Mini, iPad (3rd generation) and (4th generation) and new iPod nano and iPod Touch.
- 2013: Redesigned iOS 7, OS X Mavericks; the first free major software update for Mac, next generation Mac Pro, iPad Air, new Retina iPad Mini, iPhone 5s with Touch ID and iPhone 5c
- 2014: Swift for OS X and iOS, redesigned OS X Yosemite, iPhone 6, Apple Watch, iPad Air 2 and iMac with Retina Display.
- 2015: Apple Music, new MacBook, iPad Pro and iPhone 6s.
- 2016: Renamed OS X to macOS, new MacBook Pros, iPhone SE (1st generation), AirPods and iPhone 7.
- 2017: New iPad Pros, all-new iPhone X with Face ID, iPhone 8 and Apple Watch Series 3 with Cellular.
- 2018: iPhone XS and iPhone XS Max, iPhone XR and Apple Watch Series 4
- 2019: iPhone 11, iPhone 11 Pro and iPhone 11 Pro Max and Apple Watch Series 5
- 2020: Apple Watch Series 6, Apple Watch SE, 4th-generation iPad Air, HomePod mini, iPhone 12 and iPhone 12 mini, iPhone 12 Pro and iPhone 12 Pro Max, the Apple M1 Chip, and the first Apple silicon Mac models of the MacBook Air, Mac Mini, and 13" MacBook Pro. (Note: Due to the COVID-19 pandemic, all Apple Events were held virtually in different times throughout the year without any physical audience. The first event took place in September 15, 2020 for the new iPad Air and Apple Watches. The second event focused on the HomePod mini and iPhone 12 took place on October 13, followed by another Apple Event related to the new Apple Silicon Macs on November 10.)

== "One more thing..." ==
A typical Stevenote began with Jobs presenting sales figures for Apple products and a review of products released during the past few months. He then presented one or more new products. Reminiscent of Peter Falk's Columbo, he typically feigned some concluding remarks, turned as if to leave the stage and turned back, saying "But there's one more thing".

Some "One more thing..." segments featured:

Year	Location	Announcement	Speaker
1998	MacWorld SF	Apple's return to profitability (as "One last thing...")	Steve Jobs
1999	MacWorld NY	Apple AirPort	Steve Jobs
1999	Seybold	22-inch Apple Cinema Display	Steve Jobs
1999	Apple Special Event	iMac DV (including SE) and iMovie	Steve Jobs
2000	MacWorld SF	Aqua and CEO Jobs	Steve Jobs
2000	MacWorld NY	Power Mac G4 Cube	Steve Jobs
2001	MacWorld SF	PowerBook G4	Steve Jobs
2002	MacWorld NY	iPod for Windows iMac G4 (17-inch model)	Steve Jobs
2003	WWDC	Power Mac G5	Steve Jobs
2003	MacWorld	PowerBook G4 (12-inch aluminum model)	Steve Jobs
2004	MacWorld	iPod Mini	Steve Jobs
2004	WWDC	30-inch Apple Cinema Display	Steve Jobs
2005	MacWorld	iPod Shuffle	Steve Jobs
2005	Press conference	iPod with video	Steve Jobs
2006	MacWorld	MacBook Pro	Steve Jobs
2006	Apple Music Event	iTunes movies, Apple TV and John Mayer performance	Steve Jobs
2007	WWDC	Safari for Windows beta	Steve Jobs
2007	Apple Music Event	iTunes WiFi Music Store	Steve Jobs
2008	Apple Special Event	MacBook (aluminum unibody model)	Steve Jobs
2009	Apple Music Event	iPod Nano with video and speaker	Steve Jobs
2010	WWDC	FaceTime on iPhone 4	Steve Jobs
2010	Apple Music Event	Apple TV with iOS	Steve Jobs
2010	Apple Special Event	MacBook Air revision	Steve Jobs
2011	WWDC	iTunes Match	Steve Jobs
2014	Apple Special Event	Apple Watch	Tim Cook
2015	WWDC	Apple Music	Tim Cook
2017	Apple Special Event	iPhone X	Tim Cook
2020	Apple Special Event	Apple M1 Chip, and the first Apple silicon Mac models of the MacBook Air, Mac Mini, and 13-inch MacBook Pro. (Note: Unlike all other segments, this segment premiered as a standalone event alongside the other previous events that took place in September and October for other events. This segment premiered on November 10, 2020.)	Tim Cook
2023	WWDC	Apple Vision Pro	Tim Cook
2026	Apple Special Event	iPhone Duo	John Ternus

== See also ==
- Apple Inc. advertising
- List of Apple Inc. media events
- Worldwide Developers Conference
- Macworld/iWorld
