= Worldwide Developers Conference =

Annual technology conference by Apple

- Abbreviation: WWDC
- Status: Active
- Genre: Conference
- Frequency: Annually (since 1989)
- Venue: Apple Park
- Locations: Cupertino, California, US
- Years active: 41
- Inaugurated: 1983; 43 years ago
- Founder: Apple
- Most recent: June 8–12, 2026
- Attendance: 23 million online viewers (2020)
- Area: Worldwide
- Budget: US$50 million
- Organizer: Apple
- Website: developer.apple.com/wwdc

The Worldwide Developers Conference (WWDC) is an information technology conference held annually by Apple. Since 2020, the conference is held at Apple Park in Cupertino, California. The event is used to showcase new software and technologies in the macOS, iOS, iPadOS, watchOS, tvOS, and visionOS families as well as other Apple software; new hardware products are sometimes announced as well. WWDC is also an event hosted for third-party software developers that work on apps for iPhones, iPads, Macs, and other Apple devices. Attendees can participate in hands-on labs with Apple engineers and attend in-depth sessions covering a wide variety of topics.

The first WWDC was held in 1983, with the introduction of Apple Basic, but it was not until 2002 that Apple started using the conference as a major launchpad for new products. Beginning in 1987, WWDC was held in Santa Clara. After 15 years in nearby San Jose, the conference moved to San Francisco, where it eventually became Apple's primary media event of the year and regularly sold out. WWDC returned to San Jose 13 years later.

WWDC 2020 and WWDC 2021 were hosted as online-only conferences due to the COVID-19 pandemic. WWDC 2022 invited developers and the press back to Apple Park for the first time in about three years despite the COVID-19 pandemic. Customers and consumers watched the event via online live streams. All of these events were hosted at Apple Park in Cupertino, California. WWDC 2023, 2024 and 2025 were held both online and in-person. The most recent conference, WWDC 2026, was held both online and in-person from June 8 to June 12, 2026.

== Attendance ==
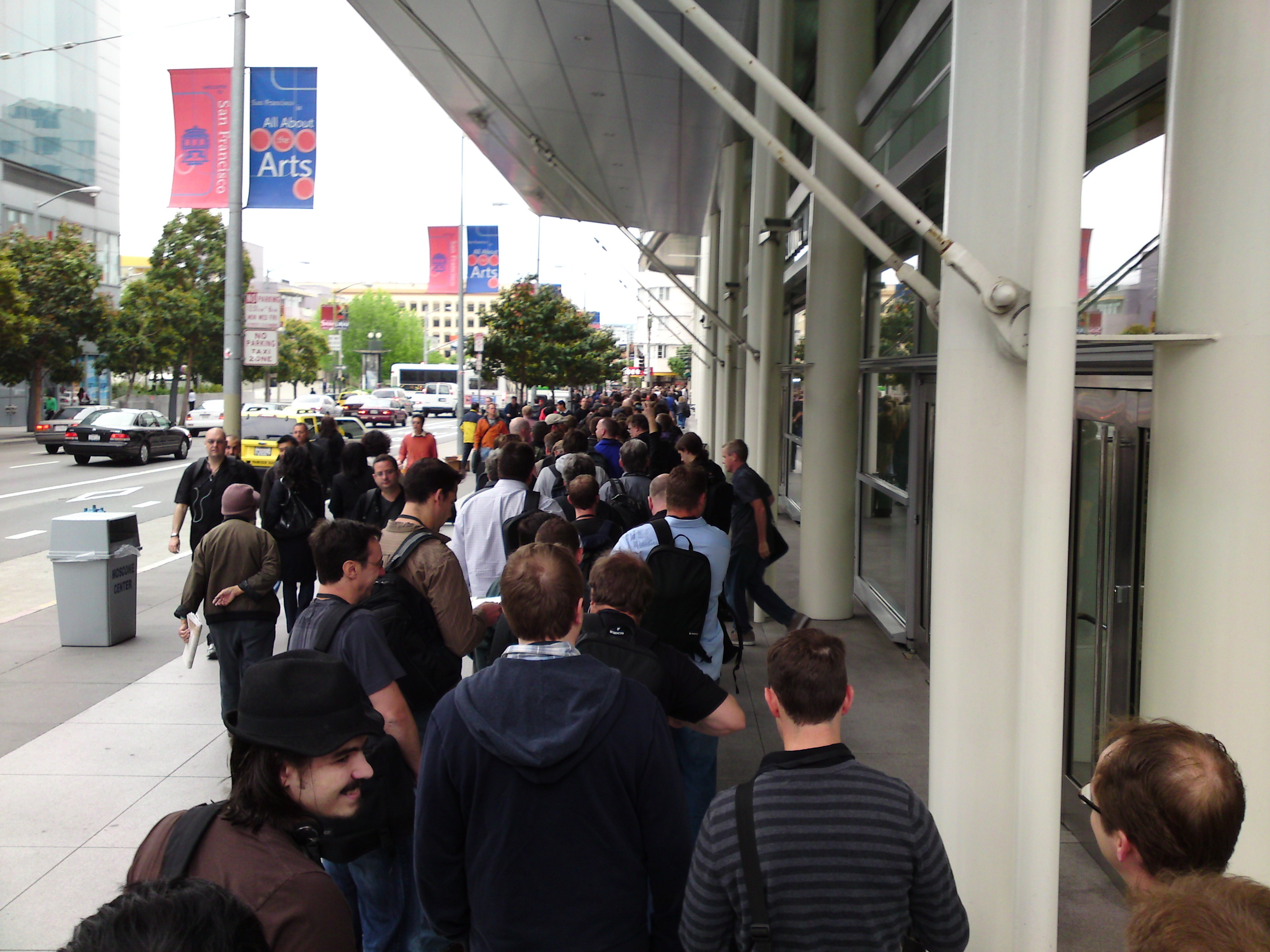
Attendees wait to enter Moscone West to watch the 2009 keynote address.

Until 2020, a $1,599 ticket was required to enter the conference. Tickets were obtained through an online lottery. Scholarships are available for students and members of STEM organizations. Attendees must be 13 years old or older and must be a member of an Apple Developer program.

Until 2007, the number of attendees varied between 2,000 and 4,200; however, during WWDC 2007, Steve Jobs noted that there were more than 5,000 attendees. The WWDC events held from 2008 to 2015 were capped, and sold out at 5,000 attendees (5,200 including special attendees). WWDC 2018 had 6,000 attendees from 77 countries, including 350 scholarship recipients.

== Content ==
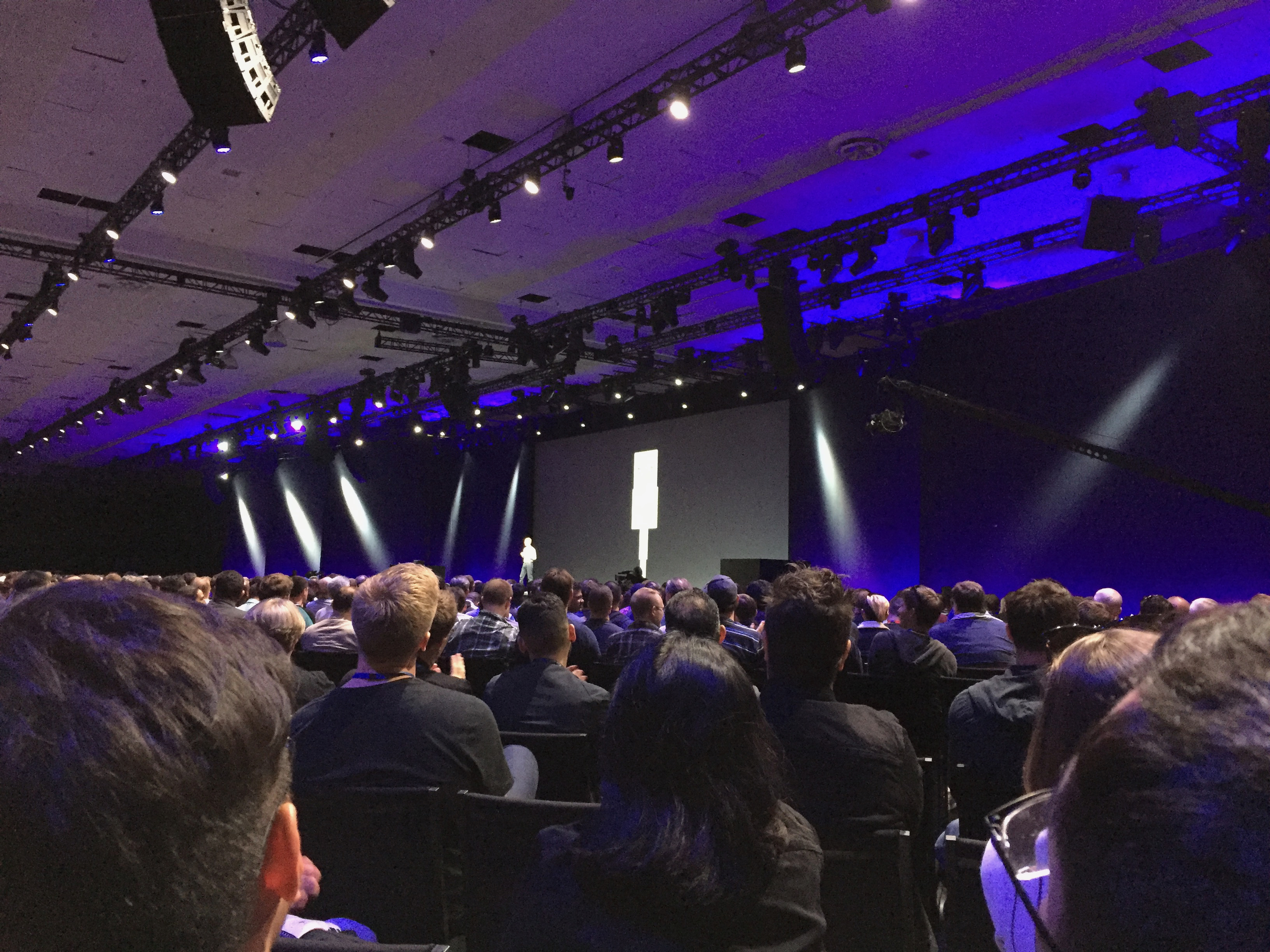
The Platforms State of the Union address at WWDC 2017

WWDC is held annually from Monday to Friday on one week in June. The conference consists primarily of a keynote address, presentation sessions, one-on-one "lab" consultations, and special get-togethers and events.

The conference begins with a Monday morning keynote address by Tim Cook and other Apple executives. (From 1998 until his resignation and death in 2011, Steve Jobs gave the keynote address, which the media often called the Stevenote.) It is attended by both conference attendees and the media, since Apple regularly makes product announcements at the event. Hardware announced during the address is sometimes exhibited in the conference hall afterwards. The keynote address is followed in the afternoon by a Platforms State of the Union address, which highlights and demonstrates changes in Apple's software developer platforms that are detailed in sessions later in the week. The Apple Design Awards are also announced on the first day of the conference.

Several session tracks run simultaneously from Tuesday through Friday. The presentations cover programming, design, and other topics and range from introductory to advanced. Almost all regularly scheduled presentations are delivered by Apple employees. These presentations are streamed live, and recordings can be viewed on demand on the Apple Developer website in the conference's iOS and tvOS applications. Lunchtime sessions are given by a variety of guest speakers who are industry experts in technology and science; these sessions are not streamed or recorded. In the past, some sessions included question-and-answer time, and a popular Stump the Experts session featured interaction between Apple employees and attendees.

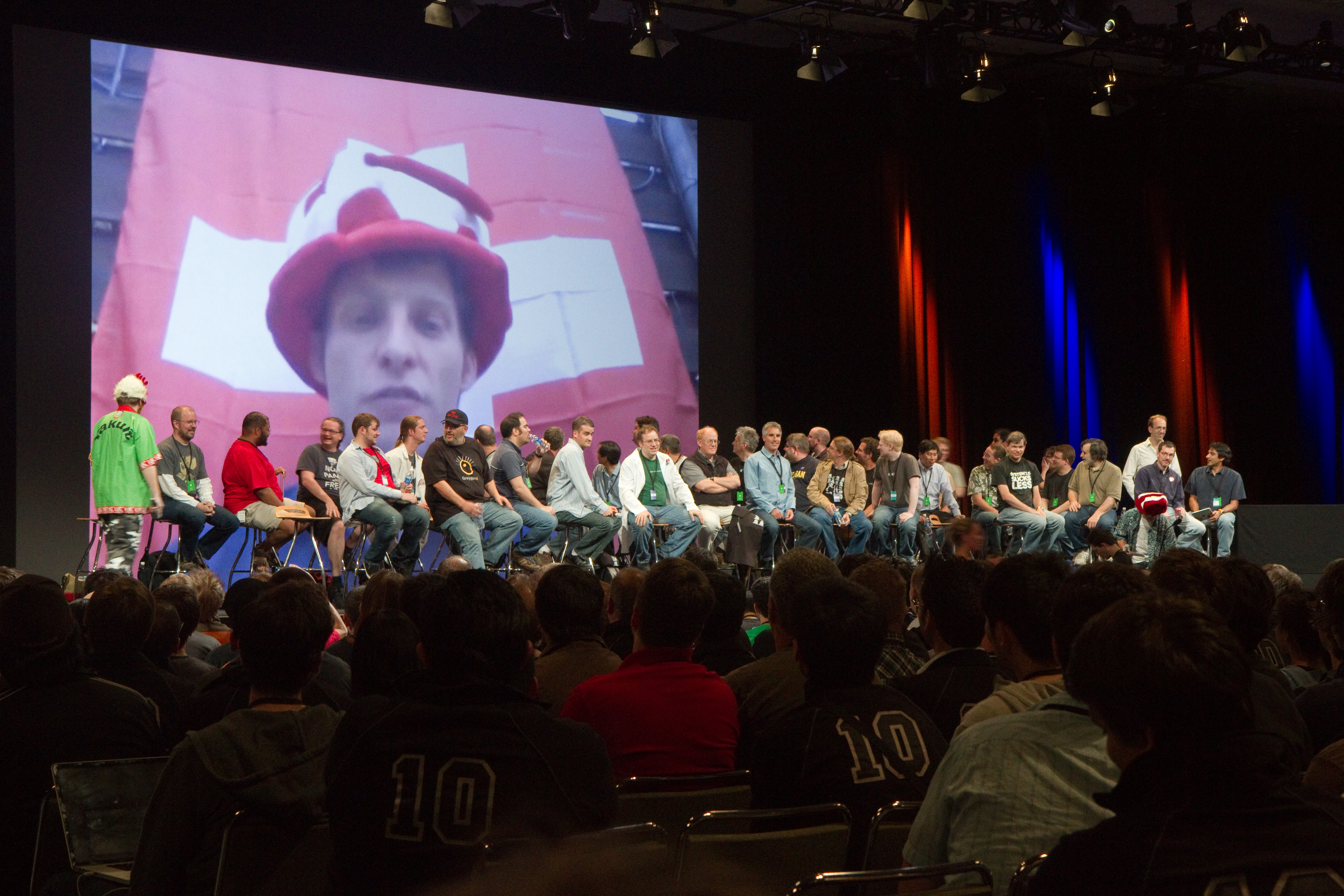
Stump the Experts at WWDC 2010

At the labs, which run throughout the week, Apple engineers are available for one-on-one consultations with developers in attendance. Experts in user interface design and accessibility are also available for consultations by appointment.

Apple organizes social get-togethers during the conference for various groups, such as women in technology or developers interested in internationalization or machine learning. The Thursday evening Bash (previously the Beer Bash) at a nearby park features live music, food, and drinks for all attendees 21 years or older.

== History ==
Timeline of events
Year	Dates	Venue
Apple Independent Software Developers Conference
1983	August 8–10	Dunfey Hotel
Apple II Forever
1984	April 23–24	Moscone Center
Apple World Conference
1986	January 15–17	Brooks Hall
1987	March 2–3	Universal Amphitheatre
Apple Developers Conference (DevCon)
1987	early April	Santa Clara Convention Center
1988	late April	San Jose Convention Center
1988	September	San Jose Convention Center
1989	May 8–12	San Jose Convention Center
Worldwide Developers Conference (WWDC)
1990	May 7–11	San Jose Convention Center
1991	May 13–17	San Jose Convention Center
1992	May 11–15	San Jose Convention Center
1993	May 10–14	San Jose Convention Center
1994	May 16–20	San Jose Convention Center
1995	May 8–12	San Jose Convention Center
1996	May 13–17	San Jose Convention Center
1997	May 12–16	San Jose Convention Center
1998	May 11–15	San Jose Convention Center
1999	May 10–14	San Jose Convention Center
2000	May 15–19	San Jose Convention Center
2001	May 21–25	San Jose Convention Center
2002	May 6–10	San Jose Convention Center
2003	June 23–27	Moscone West
2004	June 28 – July 2	Moscone West
2005	June 6–10	Moscone West
2006	August 7–11	Moscone West
2007	June 11–15	Moscone West
2008	June 9–13	Moscone West
2009	June 8–12	Moscone West
2010	June 7–11	Moscone West
2011	June 6–10	Moscone West
2012	June 11–15	Moscone West
2013	June 10–14	Moscone West
2014	June 2–6	Moscone West
2015	June 8–12	Moscone West
2016	June 13–17	Bill Graham Civic Auditorium; Moscone West
2017	June 5–9	San Jose Convention Center
2018	June 4–8	San Jose Convention Center
2019	June 3–7	San Jose Convention Center
2020	June 22–26	Virtual due to COVID-19 pandemic
2021	June 7–11	Virtual due to COVID-19 pandemic
2022	June 6–10	Apple Park
2023	June 5–9	Apple Park
2024	June 10–14	Apple Park
2025	June 9–13	Apple Park
2026	June 8–12	Apple Park

=== 1983 – Apple Independent Software Developers Conference ===
In 1983, the first WWDC was held. During this time, the event was called The Apple Independent Software Developers Conference. Participants of the event had to sign an NDA, so not much is known about the event, but what is known is that people got a first look at Lisa, the world's first personal computer with a graphical interface.

=== 1984 – Apple II Forever ===
In 1984, Jobs introduced the Macintosh, the second graphical interface personal computer, to developers. This was also the first year the conference was open to the media.

=== 1986 – Apple World Conference ===
The 1986 Apple World Conference was in San Francisco, featuring over 400 exhibitors and 200 companies showcasing Apple II and Macintosh-related products. Attendees could purchase computer accessories, peripherals, hardware, and software. Apple also introduced the monochrome laser printer LaserWriter Plus at the conference. Notable industry experts, such as Stewart Alsop II, David Bunnell, Esther Dyson, Adam Green, and Guy Kawasaki led several conferences.

=== 1987 – AppleWorld Conference ===
The AppleWorld Conference 1987 was a two-day event held in Los Angeles on March 2–3, 1987, to celebrate Apple's tenth anniversary and introduce new products. At the keynote event, Apple introduced the Macintosh SE and Macintosh II, which was the first Macintosh to support A/UX, Apple's implementation of Unix. In addition, Apple announced its collaboration with 3Com to develop EtherTalk, an Ethernet-compatible version of the AppleTalk protocol. During the opening session, Apple COO Del Yocam, Steve Wozniak, and CEO John Sculley spoke about Apple's history, philosophy, and goals, respectively. Sculley hinted at Apple's future plans, including a commitment to higher-resolution screens.

=== 1987 – Apple Developers Conference ===
The 1987 DevCon was on the first week of April.

=== Spring, 1988 ===
In the last week of April, in anticipation of the System 6.0 launch, Apple announced several features that would be included in the release. These features included a notification manager that could send data to foreground applications, Macro Maker, a program designed to create keyboard macros, Quickergraf, a performance enhancement to QuickDraw, and enhancements to the system's print monitor.

For System 7.0, Apple announced additional features, including functions related to interapplication communication, and MultiFinder would become a standard, integrated part of the operating system, replacing Finder. Apple also addressed issues related to 32-bit graphics, including Color QuickDraw.

Greater multitasking was also emphasized, in the form of interprocess communications.

In addition to these updates, Bill Atkinson introduced Version 1.2 of HyperCard, which provided support for CD-ROM and other write-protected media.

=== Summer, 1988 ===
In the second week of September, Apple announced AppleTalk support for VMS and DECnet.

=== 1989 ===
In 1989, System 7 was announced.

=== 1991 ===
In 1991, WWDC saw the first public demonstration of QuickTime.

=== 1995 ===
In 1995, WWDC'95 focused almost fully on the Copland project, which by this time was able to be demonstrated to some degree. Gil Amelio stated that the system was on-schedule to ship in beta form in later summer with an initial commercial release in the very late fall. However, very few live demos were offered, and no beta of the operating system was offered.

=== 1996 ===
In 1996, WWDC'96's primary emphasis was a new software component technology called OpenDoc, which allowed end users to compile an application from components offering features they desired most. The OpenDoc consortium included Adobe, Lotus, others, and Apple. Apple touted OpenDoc as the future foundation for application structure under Mac OS. As proof of concept, Apple demonstrated a new end-user product called Cyberdog, a comprehensive Internet application component suite offering users an integrated browser, email, FTP, telnet, finger and other services built fully of user-exchangeable OpenDoc components. ClarisWorks (later renamed AppleWorks), a principal product in Apple's wholly owned subsidiary Claris Corporation, was demonstrated as an example of a pre-OpenDoc component architecture application modified to be able to contain functional OpenDoc components.

=== 1997 ===
In 1997, WWDC marked the return of Steve Jobs as a consultant, and his famous reaction to an insult by a developer. WWDC'97 was the first show after the purchase of NeXT, and focused on the efforts to use OPENSTEP as the foundation of the next Mac OS. The plan at that time was to introduce a new system then named Rhapsody, which would consist of a version of OPENSTEP modified with a more Mac-like look and feel, the Yellow Box, along with a Blue Box that allowed extant Mac applications to run under OS emulation. The show focused mainly on the work in progress, including a short history of development efforts since the two development teams had been merged on February 4. Several new additions to the system were also demonstrated, including tabbed and outline views, and a new object-based graphics layer (NSBezier).

=== 1998 ===
In 1998, in response to developer comments about the new operating system, the big announcement at WWDC'98 was the introduction of Carbon, effectively a version of the classic Mac OS API implemented on OpenStep. Under the original Rhapsody plans, classic applications would run in sandboxed installation of the classic Mac OS, (called the Blue Box) and have no access to the new Mac OS X features. To receive new features, such as protected memory and preemptive multitasking, developers had to rewrite applications using the Yellow Box API. Developer complaints about the major porting effort to what was then a shrinking market and warnings that they might simply abandon the platform, led Apple to reconsider the original plan. Carbon addressed the problem by dramatically reducing the effort needed, while exposing some of the new functions of the underlying OS. Another major introduction at WWDC'98 was the Quartz imaging model, which replaced Display PostScript with something akin to display PDF. Although the reasons for this switch remain unclear, Quartz also included better support for the extant QuickDraw model from the classic OS, and (as later learned) Java2D. Supporting QuickDraw directly in the graphics model also led to a related announcement, that the Blue Box would now be invisible, integrated into the extant desktop, instead of a separate window.

=== 1999 ===
In 1999, WWDC'99 was essentially a progress report as the plans outlined in WWDC'98 came to fruition. Three major announcements were the opening of the operating system underlying the new OS as Darwin, improvements to the Macintosh Finder, and the replacement of QuickDraw 3D with OpenGL as the primary 3D API. The system formerly named OpenStep, and during development termed Yellow Box, was formally renamed Cocoa. 2,563 developers attended.

=== 2000 ===
WWDC 2000 was another "progress report" before the upcoming release of Mac OS X. Recent changes included a modified dock and improved versions of the developer tools. Developer Preview 4 was released at the show, with the commercial release pushed back to January 2001. Also, WebObjects was dropped in price to a flat fee of US$699. Approximately 3,600 developers attended and the band The Rippingtons played at the Apple campus.

=== 2001 ===
In 2001, Mac OS X had only recently been released, but WWDC'01 added the first release of Mac OS X Server and WebObjects 5. Over 4,000 developers attended, and leather jackets with a large blue "X" embroidered on the back were distributed to attendees.

=== 2002 ===
In 2002, Mac OS X v.10.2, QuickTime 6 and Rendezvous (now named Bonjour) were presented. Apple also said farewell to Mac OS 9 with a mock funeral, and told the developers that no more Mac OS 9 development would occur, reinforcing that the future of the Mac was now entirely on Mac OS X, thus shutting down the Classic Mac OS operating system.

=== 2003 ===
In 2003, WWDC 2003 demonstrated the Power Mac G5, previewed Mac OS X Panther (10.3), announced the launch of Safari 1.0 (concluding its beta phase), and introduced the iApps: iPhoto, iMovie, iDVD, etc. Attendees received Apple's first model of the iSight web camera (to coincide with the launch of iChat AV), pre-releases of Mac OS X 10.3 and Mac OS X 10.3 Server, the O'Reilly book Cocoa in a Nutshell, and a 17-inch notebook carry bag. Apple also screened the Pixar film Finding Nemo for attendees, ahead of its premiere in cinemas. Formerly scheduled for May 19 to 23 in San Jose, California, WWDC 2003 was rescheduled for June 23 to 27 at San Francisco's Moscone Center. Approximately 3,000 developers attended.

=== 2004 ===
In 2004, WWDC was held from June 28 to July 2. Jobs noted that 3,500 developers attended, a 17% increase from 2003. New displays were introduced in 23- and 30-inch widescreen. Mac OS X Tiger (10.4) was previewed and iTunes 4.9, the first version with integrated podcast support, was demoed by Jobs. All attendees received a developer preview of Tiger, a grey T-shirt with the Apple logo on the front and "WWDC 2004" on the back, a backpack able to hold a 17-inch PowerBook, and a copy of Apple Remote Desktop 2.0. The band Jimmy Eat World played at the Apple campus after attendees were taken there by bus from Moscone Center West.

=== 2005 ===
WWDC 2005 was held from June 6 to 10. After a basic market update, Jobs announced that Apple would transition the Mac to Intel processors. The keynote featured developers from Wolfram Research, who discussed their experience porting Mathematica to Mac OS X on the Intel platform. The conference consisted of 110 lab sessions and 95 presentation sessions, while more than 500 Apple engineers were on site alongside 3,800 attendees from 45 countries. The band The Wallflowers played at the Apple campus.

=== 2006 ===
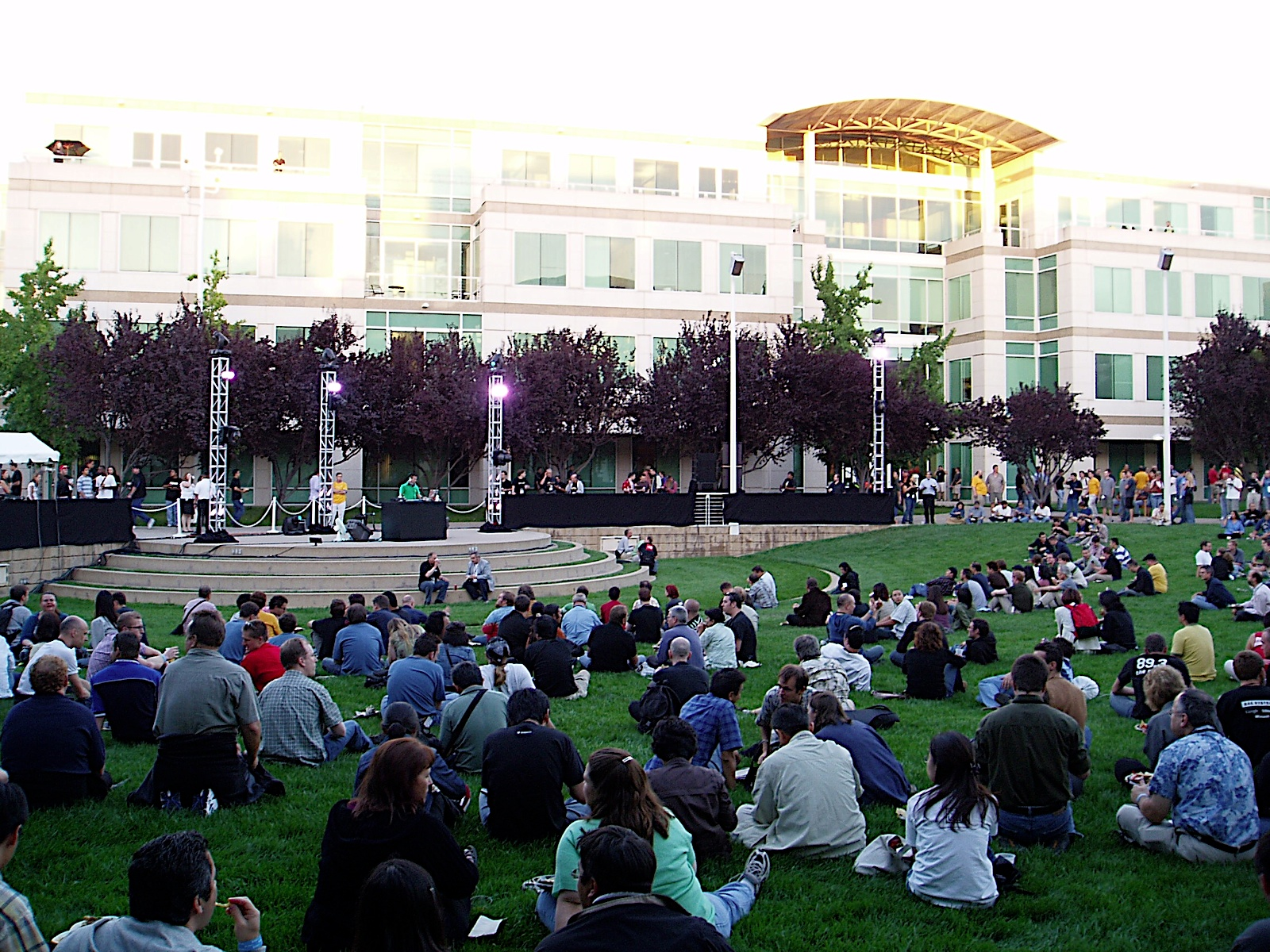
BT performing at 2006 WWDC Bash held on 1 Infinite Loop Campus

In 2006, Jobs once again delivered the keynote presentation at the WWDC, which was held from August 7 to 11 in Moscone Center West, San Francisco. The Mac Pro was announced as a replacement to the Power Mac G5, which was Apple's prior pro desktop computer and the last remaining PowerPC-based Mac. The standard Mac Pro featured two 2.66 GHz dual core Xeon (Woodcrest) processors, 1 GB RAM, 250 GB hard drive, and a 256 MB video card. An Xserve update, based on the dual core Xeons, was also announced. Redundant power and Lights Out Management were further product improvements to Apple's server lineup. While certain key Mac OS X improvements were undisclosed, there were 10 improvements in the next iteration, Mac OS X Leopard (10.5), including: full 64-bit app support, Time Machine, Boot Camp, Front Row, Photo Booth, Spaces (Virtual Desktops), Spotlight enhancements, Core Animation, Universal Access enhancements, Mail enhancements, and Dashboard enhancements (including Dashcode, and iChat enhancements). Along with the Leopard features that were announced, a major revision to the Mac OS X Server product was announced. New features to the Server included: a simplified set-up process, iCal Server (based on the CalDAV standard), Apple Teams (a set of web-based collaborative services), Spotlight Server, and Podcast Producer. The 2006 WWDC attracted 4,200 developers from 48 countries, while there were 140 sessions and 100 hands-on labs for developers. More than 1,000 Apple engineers were present at the event, and the DJ BT performed at the Apple Campus in Cupertino.

=== 2007 ===
WWDC 2007 was held from June 11 to 15 in Moscone Center West, and started with a keynote presentation from Jobs. Apple presented a feature-complete beta of Mac OS X Leopard, even though its release date was pushed back to October. Jobs announced that a version of Safari, Apple's proprietary web browser, had been created for Windows, and that a beta release was being made available online that same day. Apple also announced support for third-party development of the then-upcoming iPhone via online web applications running in Safari on the handset. The announcement implied that Apple, at least for the time being, had no plans to release an iPhone software development kit (SDK), meaning that developers must use standard web protocols. Also, Jobs noted during the keynote that more than 5,000 attendees were present at WWDC 2007, breaking the prior year's record. The band Ozomatli played at the Yerba Buena Gardens.

=== 2008 ===
In 2008, WWDC 2008 took place from June 9 to 13 in Moscone Center West. Apple reported that, for the first time, the conference had sold out. There were three tracks for developers, iPhone, Mac, and IT. Announcements at the keynote included the App Store for iPhone and iPod Touch, the stable version of the iPhone SDK, a subsidized 3G version of the iPhone for Worldwide markets, version 2.0 of iPhone OS, Mac OS X Snow Leopard (10.6), and the replacement/rebranding of .Mac as MobileMe. Seven years later, Yahoo News would describe 2008 as "perhaps the peak year for WWDC product intros", which however was marred by problems with MobileMe that caused "one of the biggest PR disasters in Apple history". For the bash held June 12, the band Barenaked Ladies played at the Yerba Buena Gardens.

=== 2009 ===
In 2009, WWDC 2009 took place from June 8 to 12 in Moscone Center West, and Apple reported that the 2009 conference sold out in late April. Announcements at the keynote included the release of the iPhone OS 3.0 software announced to developers in March, a demonstration of Mac OS X Snow Leopard (10.6), the new 13" MacBook Pro, updates to the 15" and 17" MacBook Pros, and the new iPhone 3GS. Phil Schiller, Apple's SVP for Product Marketing, presented the WWDC keynote this year, instead of Jobs, who had taken medical leave of absence since the start of the year. Attendees received a neoprene messenger bag and the band Cake played at the Yerba Buena Gardens. This was the first year plastic badges were used instead of printed paper badges.

=== 2010 ===
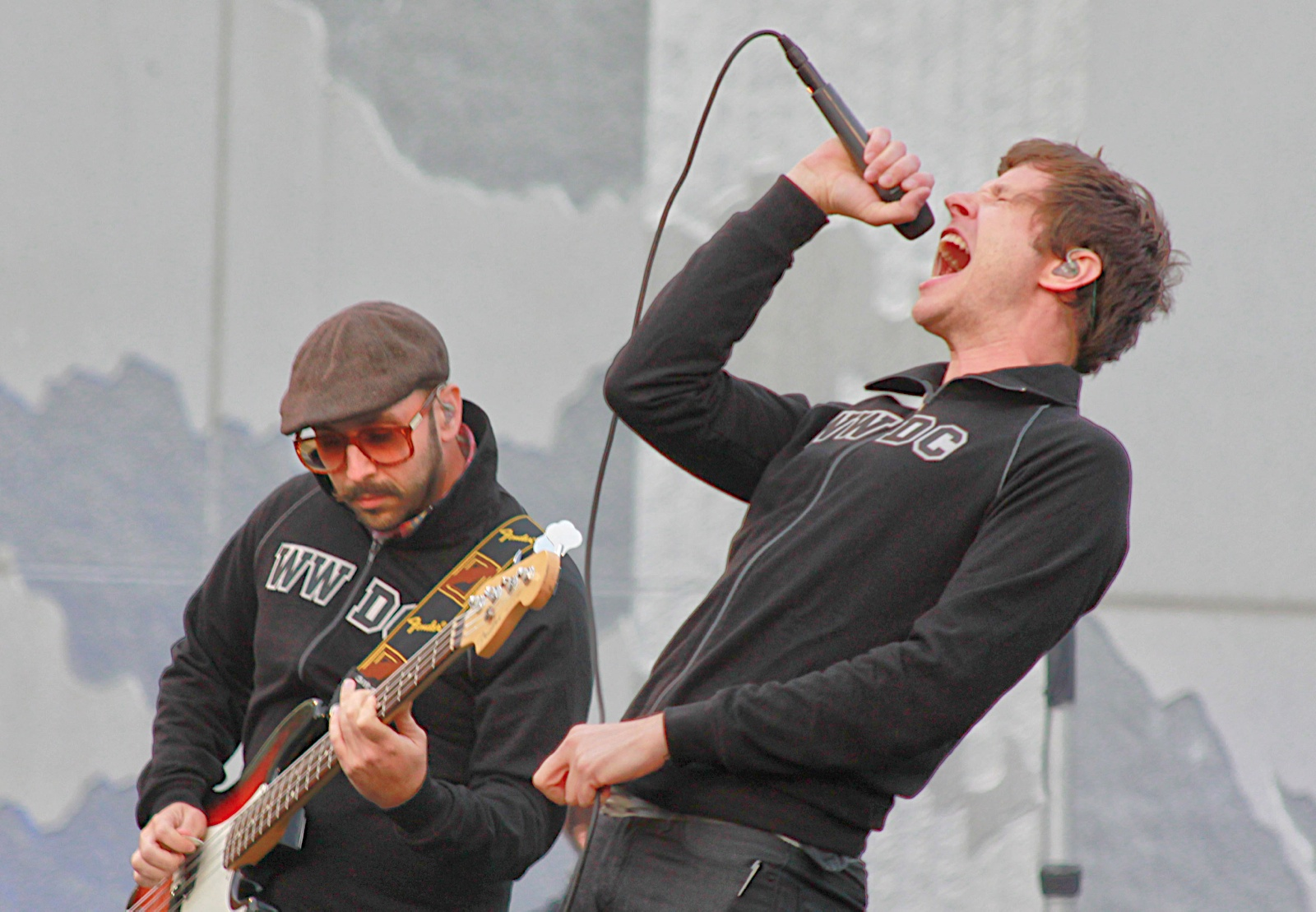
OK Go at 2010 WWDC Bash wearing conference jackets

WWDC 2010 was announced on April 28, 2010 and held at Moscone Center West from June 7 to 11. Apple reported that the conference was sold out within 8 days of tickets being made available, even though tickets were only available at the full price of US$1599 (2009 and prior, tickets could be bought with an early-bird discount of US$300). On June 7, 2010, Jobs announced the iPhone 4, whose technical problems, combined with Jobs blaming phone owners for them, would dominate the aftermath of the conference ("Antennagate"). Also at WWDC 2010, the renaming of iPhone OS to iOS was announced. The FaceTime and iMovie app for iPhone applications were also announced. The band OK Go played at the Yerba Buena Gardens. Attendees received a black track jacket with the letters "WWDC" across the vest and the number "10" stitched on the back.

=== 2011 ===
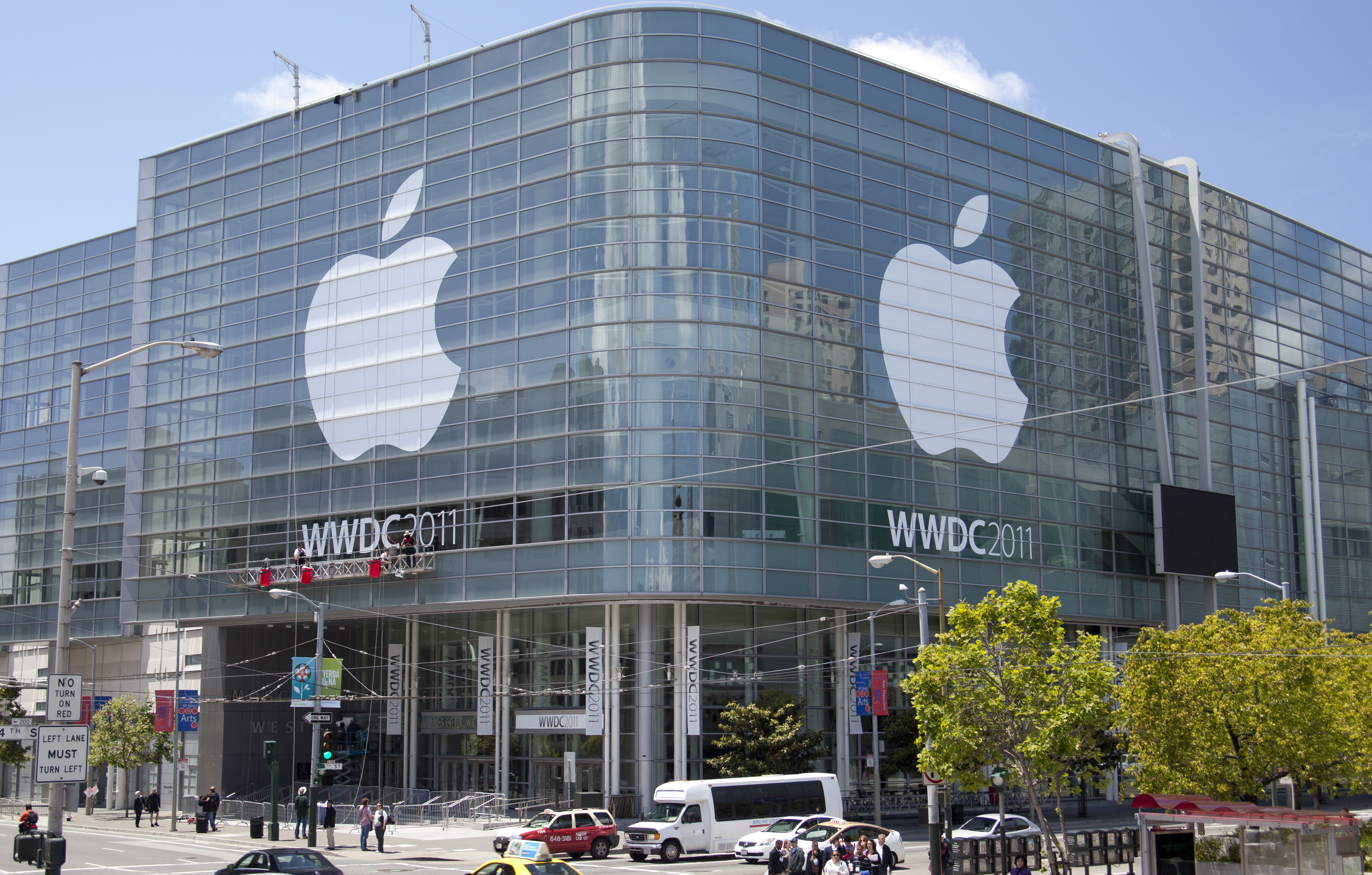
Moscone West during WWDC 2011

WWDC 2011 was held in Moscone Center West from June 6 to 10, 2011. The event reportedly sold out within just 12 hours of the 5,000 tickets being placed on sale on March 28, 2011. The ticket price also remained the same from the 2010 WWDC, selling at US$1,599, however, after-market pricing for tickets ranged from US$2,500 to US$3,500. At the keynote, Apple unveiled its next generation software: Mac OS X Lion, the eighth major release of Mac OS X; iOS 5, the next version of Apple's advanced mobile operating system which powers the iPad, iPhone and iPod Touch; and iCloud, Apple's upcoming cloud services offering. Michael Franti and Spearhead played at the Bash in Yerba Buena Gardens on June 9. Attendees received a black track jacket similar to that of the prior year, but with a smaller "WWDC" across the front and the number "11" stitched on the back. This was the final Apple event hosted by Jobs during his lifetime, before his death four months later.

=== 2012 ===
WWDC 2012 was held in Moscone Center West from June 11 to 15. The ticket price remained the same as the 2010 WWDC, selling at US$1,599. Apple changed the purchasing process by requiring purchases to be made using an Apple ID associated with a paid Apple developer account. Tickets went on sale shortly after 8:30 am Eastern Time on Wednesday April 25, 2012, and were sold out within 1 hour and 43 minutes. The keynote highlighted the launch of Apple Maps, and also announced new models of the MacBook Air, and MacBook Pro including one with Retina Display. Apple also showcased OS X Mountain Lion and iOS 6.

In prior years, attendees were required to be at least 18 years old. In 2012, Apple changed this requirement to at least 13 years after a minor who was "accidentally" awarded a student scholarship in 2011 successfully petitioned Tim Cook to retain the award. Despite the change, Beer Bash attendees were still required to be 18 years old, and 21 years old to consume alcohol, in accord with local and federal laws. Neon Trees performed at the WWDC Bash.

=== 2013 ===
In 2013, WWDC 2013 was held from June 10 to 14, 2013 in Moscone Center West. Tickets went on sale at 10 am PDT on April 25, 2013, selling out within 71 seconds (1 minute and 11 seconds). Apple also announced that it would award 150 free WWDC 2013 Student Scholarship tickets for young attendees to benefit from the conference's many workshops.

In the keynote, Apple unveiled redesigned models of the Mac Pro, AirPort Time Capsule, AirPort Extreme, and MacBook Air, and showcased OS X Mavericks, iOS 7, iWork for iCloud, and a new music streaming service named iTunes Radio. Vampire Weekend performed at the Bash on June 13 at the Yerba Buena Gardens. Attendees received a black wind breaker with the letters "WWDC" across the front and the number "13" stitched on the back.

=== 2014 ===
WWDC 2014 was held from June 2 to 6, 2014 in Moscone Center West. For the first time, the opportunity to buy tickets was given at random to developers who were members of an Apple developer program at the time of the conference announcement, and who registered at Apple's developer web site. Apple also gave 200 free Student Scholarship tickets. The keynote began on June 2 and Apple unveiled several new software items, including iOS 8—the largest update to iOS since the release of the App Store—and OS X Yosemite, which features a redesigned interface inspired by iOS. Announcements included the new programming language Swift, many developer kits and tools for iOS 8, but no new hardware. Bastille performed at the Yerba Buena Gardens, and attendees received a black windbreaker with the letters "WWDC" across the front and the number "14" stitched on the back, along with a US$25 iTunes gift card to commemorate the 25th anniversary of WWDC.

=== 2015 ===
WWDC 2015 was held from June 8 to 12, 2015 in Moscone Center West in San Francisco. The major announcements were the new features of iOS 9, the next version of OS X called OS X El Capitan, the first major software update to the Apple Watch, the June 30 debut of Apple Music, and news that the language Swift was becoming open-source software supporting iOS, OS X, and Linux. The Beer Bash was held at the Yerba Buena Gardens on June 11. Walk the Moon performed there.

=== 2016 ===
WWDC 2016 was held from June 13 to 17, 2016, at the Bill Graham Civic Auditorium and Moscone Center West in San Francisco. The announcements at the event included renaming OS X to macOS, the new version named macOS Sierra, as well as updates to iOS 10, watchOS 3, and tvOS 10. Apple proclaimed that the keynote would be the largest ever for developers; this became the reality when they allowed third-party developers to extend the functionality in Messages, Apple Maps, and Siri. Cisco Systems and Apple announced a partnership at the 2016 WWDC. Cisco APIs, accessed through Cisco DevNet, were to have greater interoperability with Apple iOS and APIs.

The keynote was more about software updates and features, as no new hardware was introduced. Apple released the Home App that works with HomeKit as a control center for all third-party applications which provide functions for the home. Also, Swift Playgrounds was announced as an iPad exclusive app that helps younger people learn to code with Apple's programming language Swift. APFS, Apple's new file system, was introduced.

The Bash was performed by Good Charlotte at the Bill Graham Civic Auditorium.

=== 2017 ===
WWDC 2017 (stylized as WWDC17) was held from June 5 to 9, 2017, at the San Jose Convention Center in San Jose, California, which was the first time since 2002 that the conference took place in the city. Software announcements included iOS 11, watchOS 4, macOS High Sierra, and tvOS 11. Hardware announcements included updates to iMac, MacBook and MacBook Pro, as well as the new iMac Pro, 10.5-inch iPad Pro and smart speaker HomePod. Fall Out Boy performed at the Bash held in Discovery Meadow on June 8.

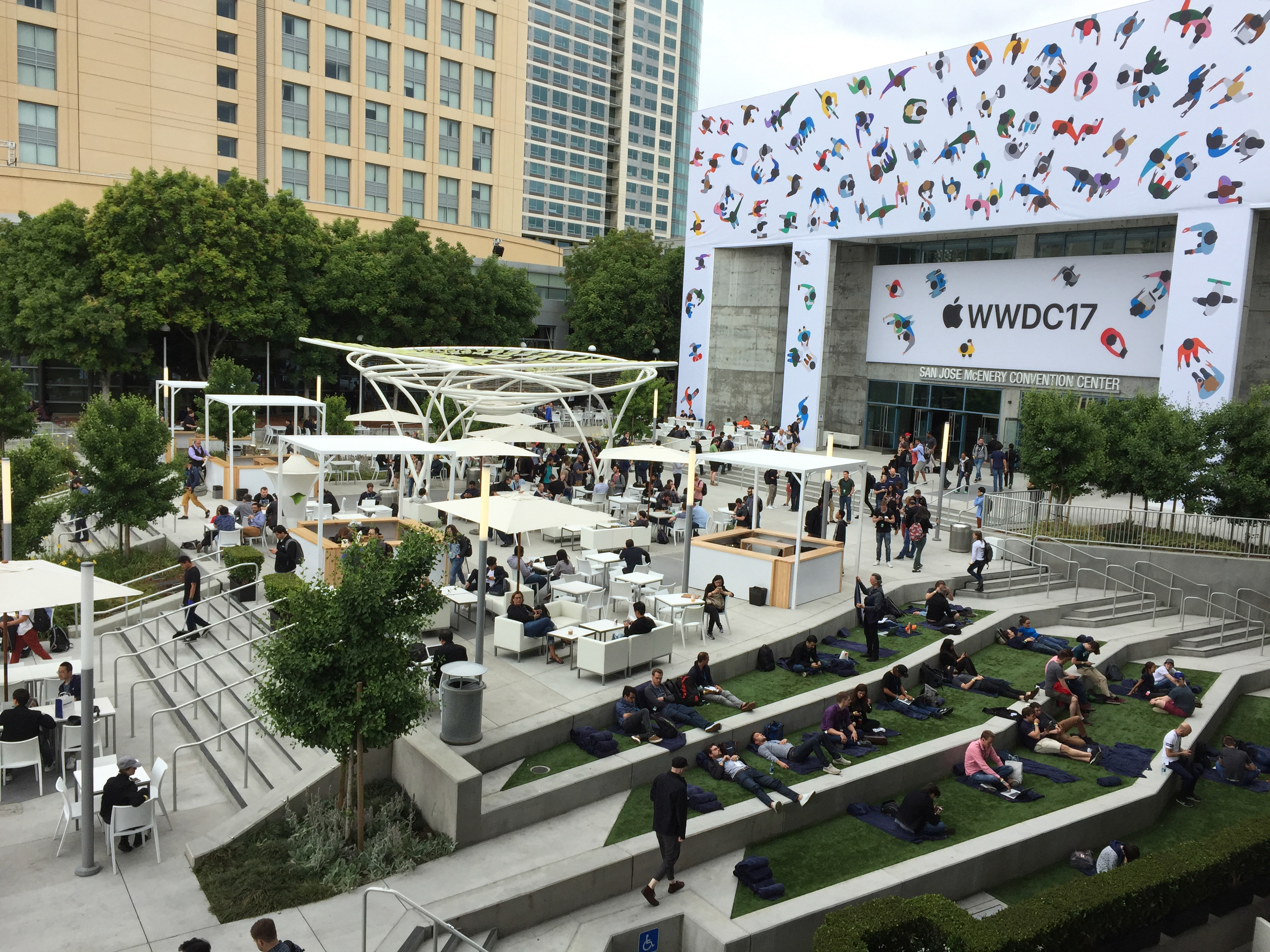
WWDC 2017 at the San Jose Convention Center

=== 2018 ===
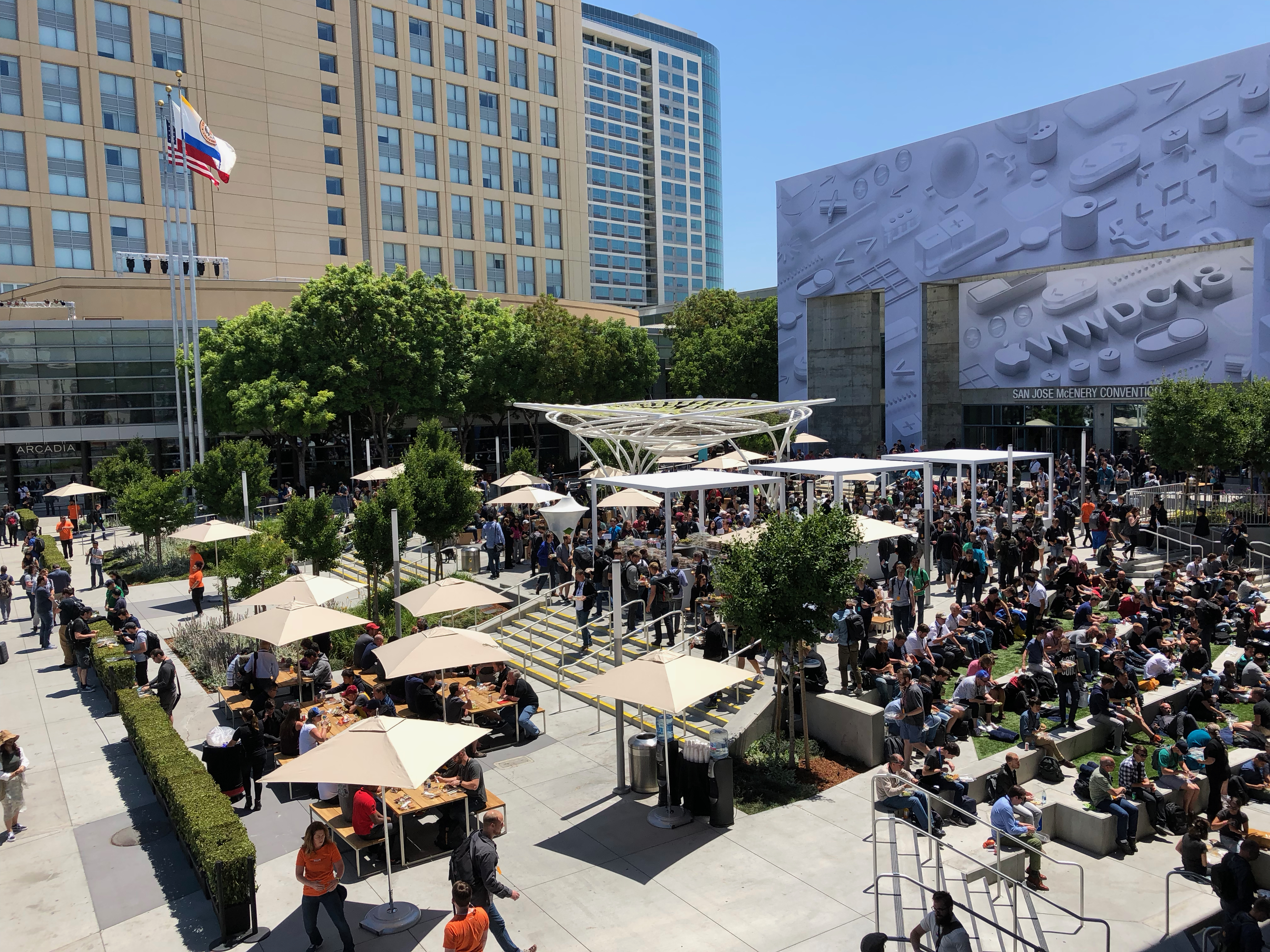
WWDC 2018 at the San Jose Convention Center

WWDC 2018 was held from June 4 to 8, 2018, at the San Jose Convention Center in San Jose, California. The announcements at the event included iOS 12, macOS Mojave, watchOS 5, and tvOS 12. As with 2016, there were no new hardware announcements. Panic! at the Disco performed at the Bash at Discovery Meadow Park.

=== 2019 ===
WWDC 2019 was held from June 3 to 7, 2019, at the San Jose Convention Center in San Jose, California. The announcements at the event included iOS 13, macOS Catalina, watchOS 6, tvOS 13, iPadOS 13, the 3rd generation Mac Pro, and the Pro Display XDR. Weezer performed at the Bash at Discovery Meadow Park.

=== 2020 ===
WWDC 2020 was held from June 22 to 26, 2020 as an online-only conference for the first time because of the ongoing COVID-19 pandemic. The announcements at the online Apple Special Event included iOS 14, iPadOS 14, watchOS 7, tvOS 14, macOS Big Sur, and Apple's transition to custom ARM processors for their Macintosh family of personal computers, including a prototype ARM-based Mac for developer use. The event video footage was recorded at Apple Park in Cupertino, California. In total, the event got over 22 million views with around 72 hours of content.

=== 2021 ===
WWDC 2021, with the tag line "Glow and behold.", was held from June 7 to 11, 2021 as another online-only conference also due to the COVID-19 pandemic. iOS 15, iPadOS 15, watchOS 8, tvOS 15, macOS Monterey, and other software updates were announced. There were no new hardware announcements at the conference. As with 2020, the event video footage was recorded at Apple Park in Cupertino, California.

=== 2022 ===
WWDC 2022, with the tagline "Call to code.", was held from June 6 to 10, 2022, as an online conference due to the COVID-19 pandemic despite improvements, although there was a special day at Apple Park on June 6, allowing developers and students to watch the online events together. Despite the COVID-19 pandemic, the event also occurred as an in-person conference for the first time since the previous one held in 2019. iOS 16, iPadOS 16, watchOS 9, tvOS 16 and macOS Ventura were announced at the conference. Stage Manager for Macs was also introduced during the initial presentation. Hardware announcements included the M2 chip and updated MacBook Air and 13-inch MacBook Pro models based on it.

=== 2023 ===
WWDC 2023, with the tagline "Code new worlds" was held from June 5 to 9 in an online format with an in-person experience at Apple Park on the first day of the show. Similarly to the previous years, Apple held the Swift Student Challenge, launched in 2020 for the first time, with applications through April 19 and results on May 9. Prizes included WWDC outerwear, AirPods Pro, a customized pin set, and a one-year membership in the Apple Developer Program. Among the winners, some were randomly chosen to attend the Apple Park special event. For software, Apple introduced macOS 14 Sonoma, the 20th major release of macOS, as well as iOS 17, iPadOS 17, watchOS 10, tvOS 17 and firmware updates to AirPods. For hardware, they announced the Apple M2 Ultra SoC for Macs, 15-inch MacBook Air with M2, Mac Studio with M2 Max and Ultra and the Mac Pro with M2 Ultra. They also unveiled an AR/VR headset under the name of "Apple Vision Pro", which would have games and experiences developed with Unity.

=== 2024 ===
WWDC 2024, with the tagline "Action packed", was held from June 10 to 14, 2024, in an online format with an in-person event at Apple Park on June 10. iOS 18, iPadOS 18, watchOS 11, macOS 15 Sequoia and visionOS 2 were announced at this event, with one of its prominent focus being on the AI tailor made for iOS, iPadOS, and macOS which was branded as Apple Intelligence. As with 2021, no new hardware was announced at the conference.

=== 2025 ===
WWDC 2025, with the tagline "Sleek peek", took place from June 9 to 13, 2025, in an online format with an in-person event at Apple Park on June 9. iOS 26, iPadOS 26, watchOS 26, macOS 26 Tahoe, tvOS 26, and visionOS 26 were announced at this event, along with Apple's new Liquid Glass design language. No new hardware was announced at the conference.

=== 2026 ===
WWDC 2026, with the tagline "All systems glow", took place from June 8 to 12, 2026, in an online format with an in-person event at Apple Park on June 8. iOS 27, iPadOS 27, watchOS 27, macOS Golden Gate, tvOS 27, and visionOS 27 were announced at that event. Additionally, Apple announced Siri AI.

== Scholarships ==
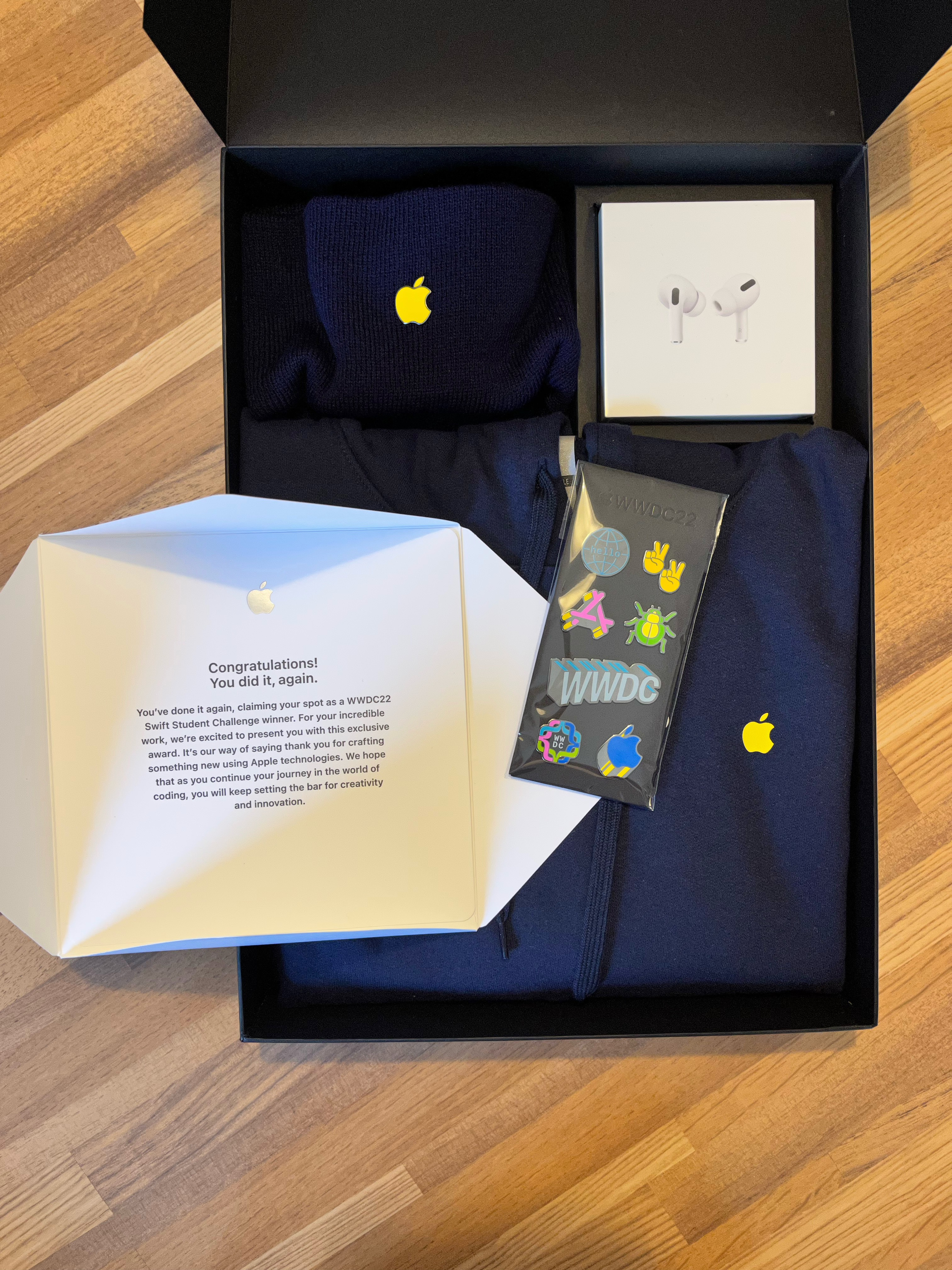
Award of the Swift Student Challenge 2022

In 2020, due to the COVID-19 pandemic, Apple replaced the annual WWDC Scholarships with the Swift Student Challenge, a programming contest held before WWDC which centers on the Swift programming language. As of 2020, the program was managed by Apple head of developer marketing Esther Hare. 350 winners are selected, who receive WWDC-themed clothing, a metal pin set, the ability to meet Apple engineers, a one-year membership of the Apple Developer Program, and since 2022, a pair of AirPods Pro. In 2022, Tim Cook met with 12 of the winners. In 2023, students could also enter a lottery for in-person attendance of WWDC at Apple Park. In 2024, in-person attendance was changed from a lottery to the 50 best projects out of the 350 winners, these are dubbed "Distinguished Winners."

The task is to create an interactive scene, shorter than 3 minutes, inside Swift Playgrounds, an Apple app that teaches introductory programming. The projects are judged based on technical accomplishment, creativity, and the text accompanying the submission.

The challenge is only open to students 13 or older in the United States, or the minimum age in their jurisdiction (for example, 16 in the European Union) who are currently enrolled in an accredited school or have recently graduated, and who are not working full-time as developers. Students can win the award up to four times. Students may win the Distinguished Winner award up to one time.

== Related events ==
Several third-party conferences are held in conjunction with WWDC each year, including AltConf, Layers, and NextDoor. Prominent podcasters Jim Dalrymple and John Gruber hold events nearby, and former Apple evangelist James Dempsey performs a benefit concert.

Previously, Apple also announced new products at Macworld Expo and Apple Expo. Apple continues to hold "special events" throughout the year for product introductions, and on rare occasions releases products without holding an event.

== See also ==
- Apple Inc. advertising
- Apple Music Festival
- Google I/O
- Microsoft Build
- Samsung Developer Conference
- List of Apple Inc. media events
- Macworld/iWorld
- Stevenote
