= Greg Joswiak =

American businessman

- Born: Gregory Joswiak
- Education: B.S., University of Michigan, 1986 (Computer Engineering)
- Occupations: Senior Vice President, Worldwide Marketing
- Employer: Apple Inc.

Gregory "Joz" Joswiak is an American business executive who is the senior vice president of worldwide marketing at Apple Inc. He replaced Phil Schiller, who served in a similar role, in 2020. As lead marketer for the company, he oversees marketing of iPhones, iPads, MacBooks and services such as Apple TV. Per Apple, Joswiak "played a pivotal role in developing and launching the original iPod and iPhone".

== Early life and career ==
Joswiak graduated with a degree in Computer Engineering from the University of Michigan in 1986. On June 9th, 1986, he joined Apple where he worked on early Macintosh computers and supported third-party developers for the Mac platform. Joswiak has worked on marketing for the iPod, iPhone and iPad products.
