= Apple Expo =

Former annual sales conference and technology exposition

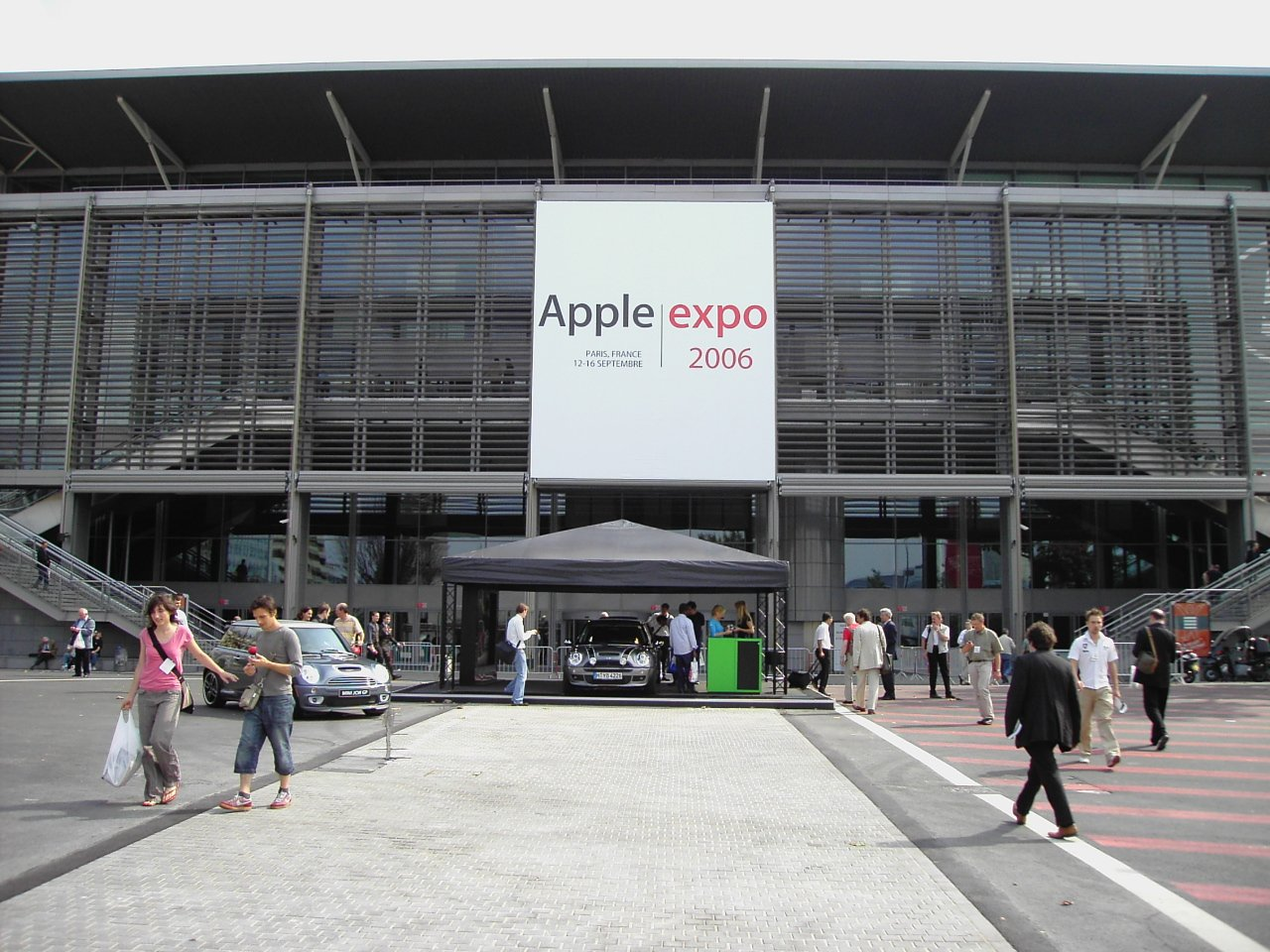
Apple Expo 2006 at Hall 5, Parc des Expositions de Paris

The Apple Expo was a European annual sales conference and technology exposition held by Apple Inc. The conference featured over 250 exhibitors annually, with Apple being its main exhibitor. This conference was most often viewed as the European counterpart to MacWorld Expo, a similar conference that was held annually in San Francisco.

== History ==
The Apple Expo event was originally invented and held in France around 1984 by the employees of the French Apple distributor Seedrin Sarl, and its manager Jean-Louis Gassée. All the employees of this small distributor were each time involved in participating for this annual show, where several third-party software and hardware distributors would also have their booth. Apple Seedrin (which turned to Apple France) continued for decades to organise this event every mid September. Within the small (100 people) Apple France subsidiary, a team was even created (with Adeline Domenjoz) to set up this event. Due to the growing size of the event, Reed OIP was contracted for show management.

Around the year 2000, the Apple corporation took the ownership of the Apple Expo organisation, and Steve Jobs included this recurring date in his possible events list. With this new corporate management, the French subsidiary employees slowly stopped being be part of the booth demo team. The last few years showed that the event was slowly turning into an iPod expo, more than a Mac one. Year after year, Apple stopped releasing new products during this event, removing much of its booth investments, and limited the amount of available new products on show. The last issue was a Reed Expositions-only event, without even an Apple booth.

There were other similar events held in Europe, like MacExpo in London, but with no link with the Apple Expo.

Below there is a time line of all significant product announcements announced at the Apple Expo:

=== Timeline ===
Year	Location	Description
2000	Paris, France	In this keynote the Mac OS X public beta was announced, as well a series of new iBooks.
2001	N/A	The Apple Expo was cancelled due to the September 11, 2001, attacks.
2002	Paris, France	Much of the keynote consisted of a demo of Apple's new Mac OS X v10.2 operating system. Steve Jobs also announced iCal and iSync.
2003	Paris, France	Steve Jobs announced various upgrades to the PowerBook G4 line of computers. As well, he announced the Apple Bluetooth wireless keyboard and mouse.
2004	Paris, France	Due to Steve Jobs having pancreatic cancer, the keynote was instead done by Phil Schiller, an Apple executive. Schiller announced the new iMac G5.
2005	Paris, France	The traditional keynote done by Apple at both MacWorld Expo, and Apple Expo was left out. The only product announced by Apple was a new and improved .Mac bundle.
2006	Paris, France	From 12 to 16 September at Paris expo.
2007	Paris, France	25 to 29 September.
2008	Paris, France	Apple Expo Canceled. Apple said it would not participate in the Paris expo at all, saying it would be participating in fewer trade shows.

== Apple Expo 2002 ==
Companies presented, including:

- eBeam
- Corel
- Epson
- HP
- Wacom
