= Xeon W =

Xeon W is a brand of x86 processors designed, manufactured, and marketed by Intel, targeted at the workstation market. The brand has been used for processors under several microarchitectures:

- Intel Skylake workstation processors (first released 2017)
- Intel Cascade Lake workstation processors (first released 2019)
- Intel Comet Lake workstation processors (first released 2020)
- Intel Rocket Lake workstation processors (first released 2021)
- Intel Ice Lake workstation processors (first released 2021)
- Intel Sapphire Rapids workstation processors (first released 2023)

== See also ==
- List of Intel Xeon processors
