= Phil Schiller =

American businessman (born 1960)

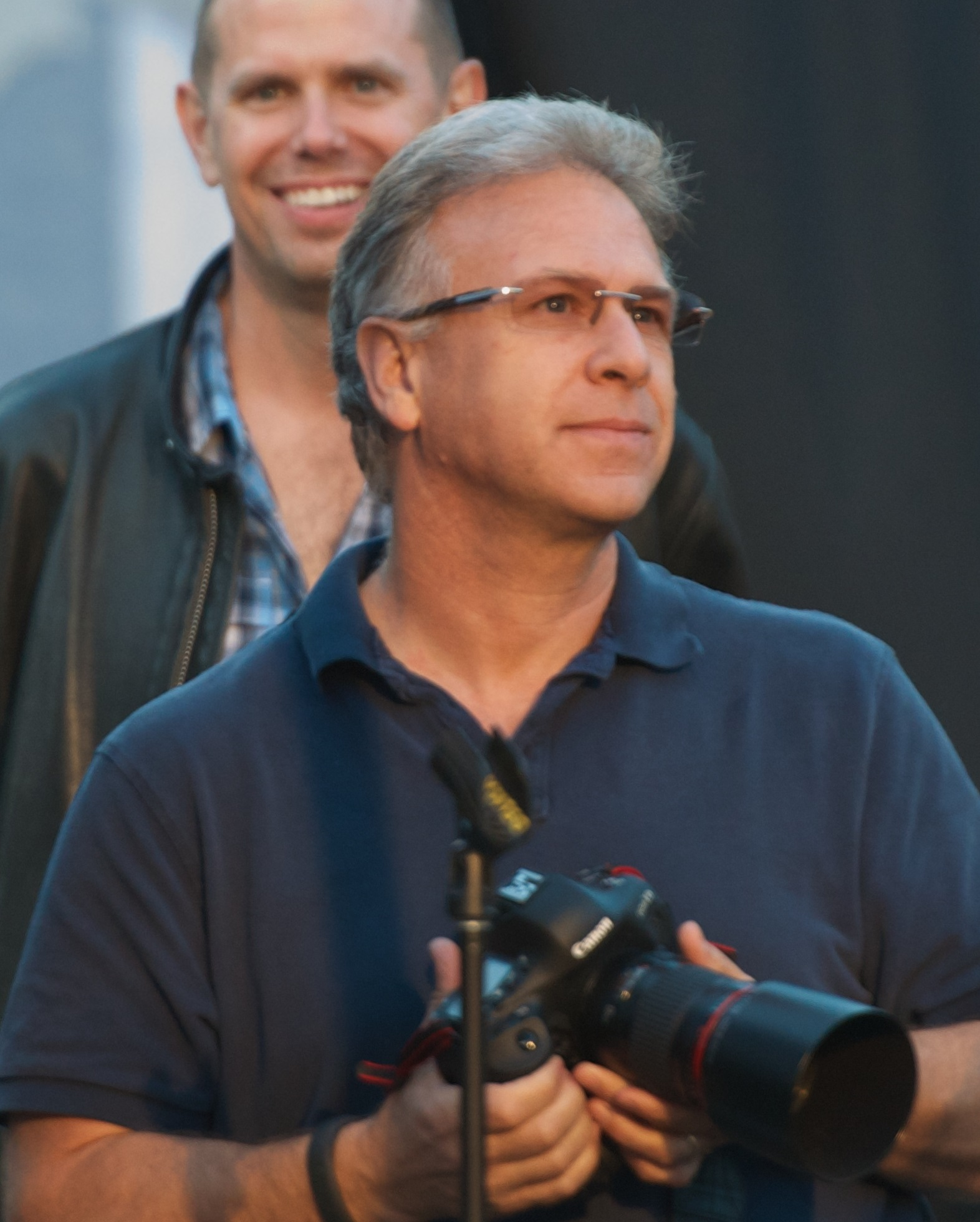
- Schiller in 2012
- Born: Philip W. Schiller; June 8, 1960 (age 66); Boston, Massachusetts, U.S.
- Education: Boston College (B.S.)
- Occupation: Apple Fellow
- Years active: 1987–present
- Employer: Apple Inc.
- Board member of: Illumina (2016–)

Philip W. Schiller (born June 8, 1960) is an American businessman, spokesperson, and an Apple Fellow at Apple Inc. He is a prominent figure in Apple's keynotes and has been a member of the company's executive team since Steve Jobs returned to Apple in 1997.

In 2020 he became the first person in over 20 years to be appointed as an Apple Fellow, one of the company's highest-ranking positions and an honor previously bestowed on co-founder Steve Wozniak among a handful of other people.

== Early life and education ==
Schiller was born in Boston, Massachusetts, on June 8, 1960, to a Jewish family. He graduated from Boston College in 1982 with a Bachelor of science in biology.

== Career ==
Prior to his role at Apple, Schiller has held a variety of positions including Vice President of Product Marketing at Macromedia of San Francisco, California; Director of Product Marketing at FirePower Systems, Inc. of Menlo Park, California; IT Manager at Nolan, Norton & Co. of Lexington, Massachusetts; and Programmer and Systems Analyst at Massachusetts General Hospital in Boston, Massachusetts.

At Apple, Schiller worked on the formation and marketing of iMac, MacBook, MacBook Pro, iPod, macOS, and subsequent products. Schiller is credited with coming up with the idea for the original iPod's click wheel interface.

Schiller frequently played a supporting role in keynotes given by Steve Jobs, usually presenting new products like iPhones and iPads. While Jobs was on medical leave Schiller gave several keynotes including Apple's last appearance at Macworld/iWorld on January 6, 2009, and the WWDC keynote on June 8, 2009; both presentations were typically done by Jobs himself. Among the things announced at these events were the updated MacBook Pro lines, the iPhone 3GS, and new versions of iLife and iWork as well as pricing and DRM changes to the iTunes Store.

Schiller was previously Senior Vice President of Worldwide Product Marketing before adopting his new title of Apple Fellow on August 4, 2020. Greg "Joz" Joswiak took over Schiller's previous role.
