= IMac =

Line of all-in-one desktop computers by Apple

iMac

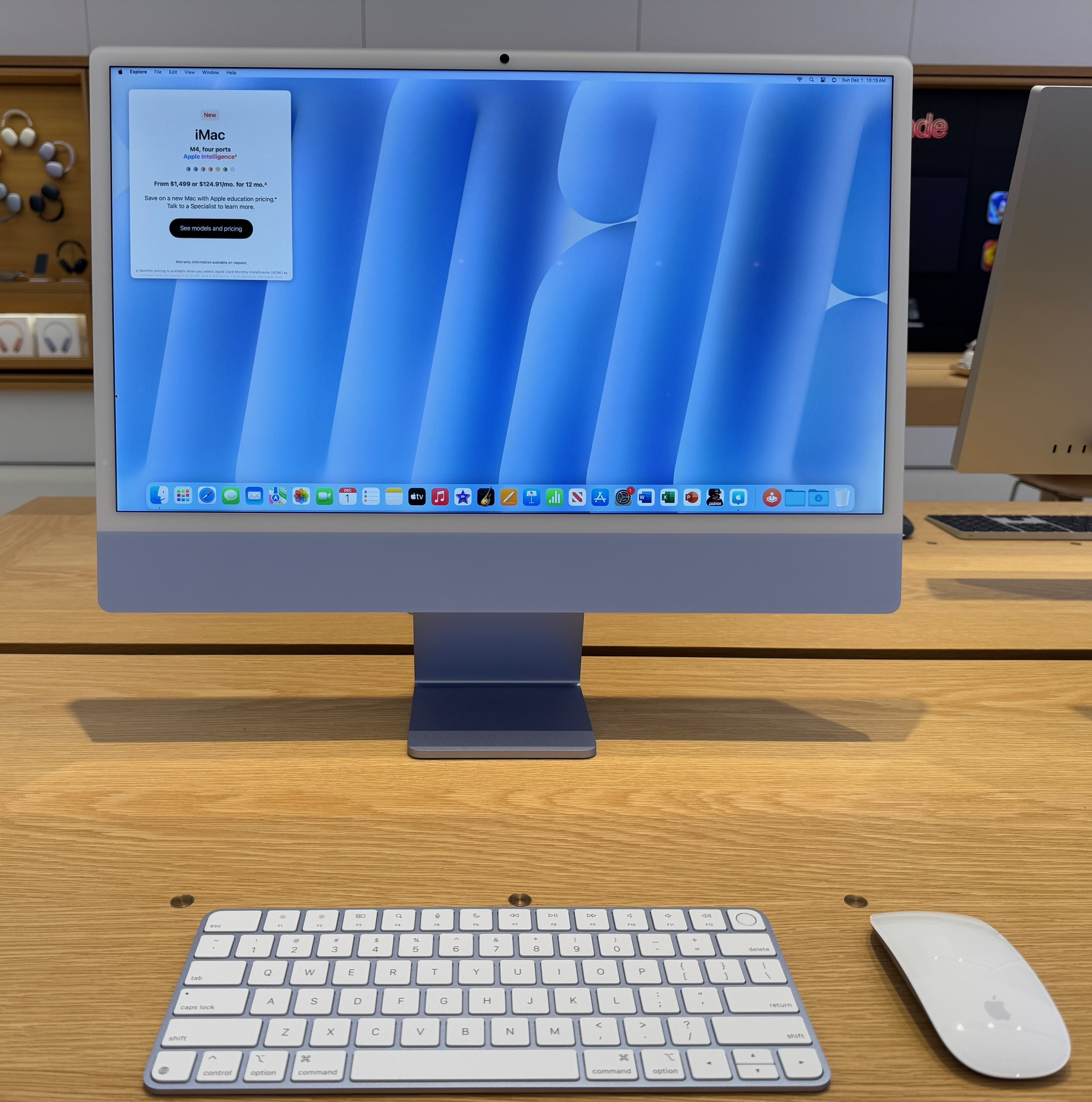
- Front face of a blue iMac (24-inch, M4, 2024)
- Developer: Apple
- Product family: Macintosh
- Released: August 15, 1998; 28 years ago (G3)
- Operating system: macOS (see § Supported operating systems for previous)
- Related: Mac Mini, Mac Pro
- Website: apple.com/imac

The iMac is a series of all-in-one computers from Apple, sold as part of the company's Mac family of computers. First introduced in 1998, it has remained a primary part of Apple's consumer desktop offerings since and evolved through seven distinct forms. The iMac natively runs the macOS operating system.

Its original form, the iMac G3, had a gumdrop, egg-shaped look with a CRT monitor, mainly enclosed by a colored, translucent plastic case. The computer was, at the time, an inexpensive, consumer-oriented computer that would easily connect to the Internet. The second major revision, the iMac G4, moved a design with a hemispherical base containing all the main components and an LCD monitor on a freely moving arm attached to it. The third and fourth revisions, the iMac G5 and the Intel iMac, placed all the components immediately behind the display in a plastic casing, creating a slim unified design that tilts only up and down on a simple metal base. The fifth, sixth and seventh revisions swapped the plastic enclosure for metal and became progressively thinner over each revision.

The design of the iMac has been seen as both controversial and trendsetting. From its introduction, the computer has eschewed many entrenched legacy technologies, notably becoming an early adopter of the USB port, and removing floppy disk and later optical disc drives. The most recent revision, the Apple silicon iMac, uses Apple's own processors (silicon) and is 11.5 millimeters (0.45 in) thick. Between 2017 and 2021, Apple also sold a workstation-class version of the computer called the iMac Pro.

== History ==
The timeline of iMac from 1998 to 2021, showing the change in the physical characteristics of the product

Apple was facing bankruptcy in the mid-1990s, with its market share cannibalized by Windows-based PCs and Macintosh clones. The company had tried and failed to ship a modern operating system for its hardware. Looking instead for an outside product to acquire, Apple announced its purchase of NexT, Inc. in 1996. Alongside Next's products and software came Steve Jobs, Apple's co-founder who had been ousted from the company years earlier. Jobs was initially brought on at Apple as an adviser, but Jobs replaced Gil Amelio as interim CEO in 1997 and began a reorganization of the company. He reduced Apple's multitude of confusing computer options to just four: one laptop and one desktop model for consumers, and another laptop and desktop model for professionals. What became the iMac began as Apple's effort to develop the consumer desktop to fill that product gap.

Apple's head of design Jony Ive and the rest of the design team developed sketches for a distinctive, all-in-one computer that was to be a legacy-free PC focused on ease of use and internet connectivity. The design team made the new computer colorful and translucent, built around a cathode-ray tube display wrapped in a curved plastic case. Ad agency director Ken Segall suggested the "iMac" name: it was short, had "Mac" in it, and the "i" prefix suggested the internet. Jobs initially hated it, but the name ultimately stuck. Apple later adopted the 'i' prefix across its consumer hardware and software lines, such as iPod, iBook (later MacBook), iPhone, iPad and various pieces of software such as the iLife, the iCloud suite, iWork, and the company's media player and store, iTunes. The iMac was unveiled on May 6, 1998.

The manufacturers for the CRT-based iMac were LG and eventually Foxconn as well.

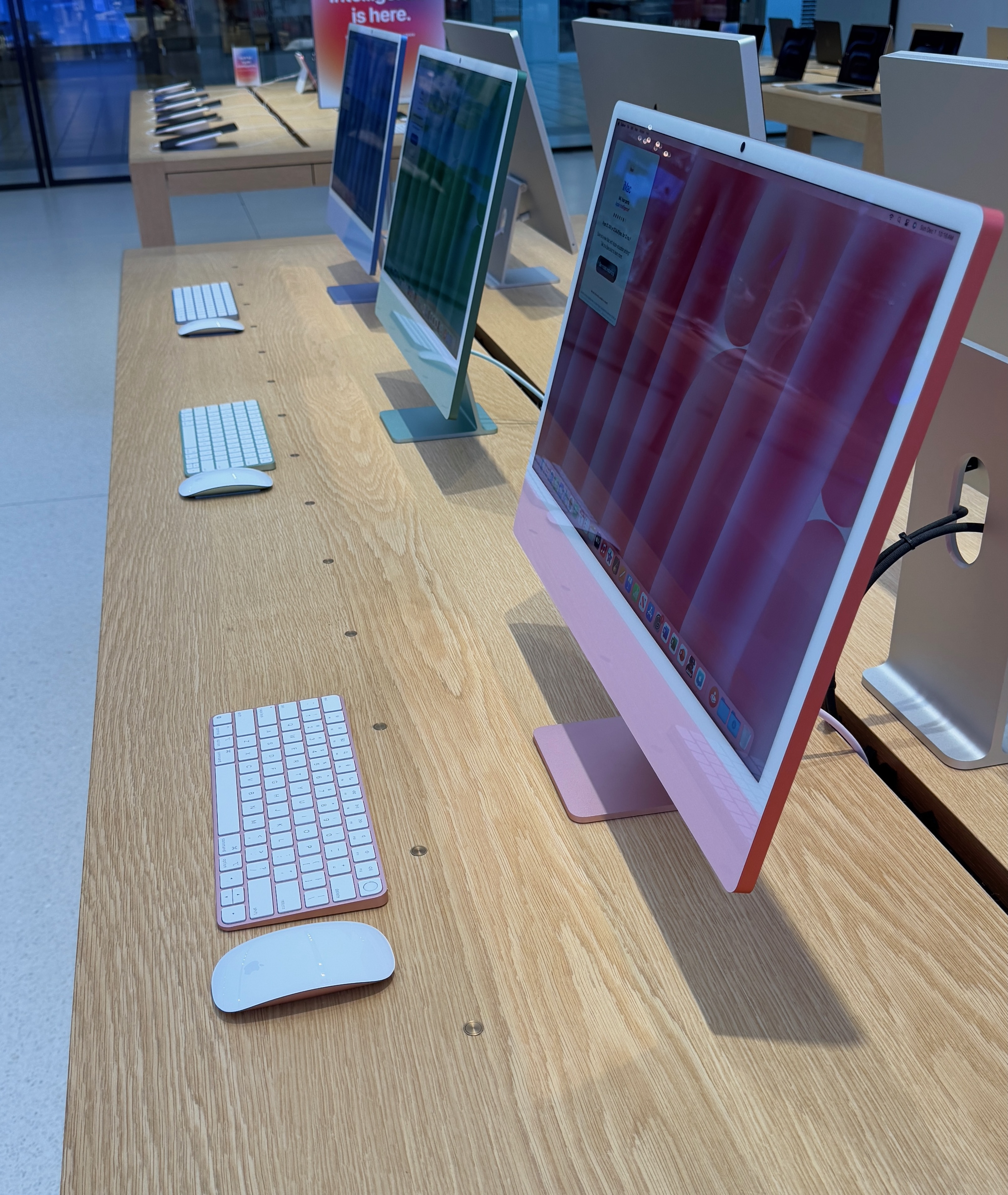
Three of the seven iMac colors available in 2024—blue, green and pink—with corresponding Magic Keyboards

Despite mixed reviews from the tech press, the iMac was a major commercial success at a time when Apple desperately needed a hit product. The iMac ultimately sold more than six million units, being revised multiple times and appearing in 13 different colors and patterns. The iMac was "designed to make it easy for home users to connect to the Internet." A commercial, dubbed "Simplicity Shootout", pitted seven-year-old Johann Thomas and his Border Collie Brodie, with an iMac, against Adam Taggart, a Stanford University MBA student, with an HP Pavilion 8250, in a race to set up their computers. Johann and Brodie finished in 8 minutes and 15 seconds, whereas Adam was still working on it by the end of the commercial.

As the prices of flat screen liquid-crystal displays (LCDs) TVs began to fall, Apple conceived of an update to the iMac. Inspired by a sunflower, the iMac G4 put the computer in a semi-hemispherical base, with the display sitting above it on a stainless steel arm. The arm allowed the display to be easily tilted, rotated, and raised and lowered by a touch. The exuberant colors of the old iMac were replaced by stark white.

Ever-increasing screen sizes led Apple to make the iMac G5 a more conservative design, with the components of the computer attached to the back of the display and raised above the resting surface with an aluminum foot.

By 2005, it had become more and more apparent that IBM's development for the desktop implementation of PowerPC was grinding to a halt. Apple announced at the Worldwide Developers Conference that it would be switching the Macintosh to the x86 architecture and Intel's line of Core processors. The first Intel-equipped Macs were unveiled on January 10, 2006: the MacBook Pro and a new iMac, which outwardly looked identical to the iMac G5. Within nine months, Apple had smoothly transitioned the entire Macintosh line to Intel. The Intel-based iMac was redesigned in 2007 with an aluminum enclosure, which was gradually refined and slimmed down in the following years. In 2014, the iMac added high-resolution "Retina" 4K and 5K displays, and a more powerful, professional-oriented model, the iMac Pro, was introduced in 2017.

Apple announced a shift from Intel processors to its own Apple silicon in June 2020, and redesigned iMacs with the Apple M1 chip were announced in April 2021. These new models harkened back to the iMac G3, coming in seven colors, and marked the return to a single display size for the first time since 2002. The iMac has since been updated to use later M-series chips.

== Influence ==
The original iMac is the first legacy-free PC. It is the first Macintosh computer to have a USB port but no floppy disk drive. Subsequently, all Macs have included USB. Via the USB port, hardware makers could make products compatible with both x86 PCs and Macs. Previously, Macintosh users had to seek out certain hardware, such as keyboards and mice specifically tailored for the "old world" Mac's unique ADB interface and printers and modems with MiniDIN-8 serial ports. Only a limited number of models from certain manufacturers were made with these interfaces and often came at a premium price. USB, being cross-platform, has allowed Macintosh users to select from a large selection of devices marketed for the Wintel PC platform, such as hubs, scanners, storage devices, USB flash drives, and mice. After the iMac, Apple continued to remove older peripheral interfaces and floppy drives from the rest of its product line.

Borrowing from the 1997 Twentieth Anniversary Macintosh, the various LCD-based iMac designs continued the all-in-one concept first envisioned in Apple's original Macintosh computer. The successful iMac allowed Apple to continue targeting the Power Macintosh line at the high-end of the market. This foreshadowed a similar strategy in the notebook market when the iMac-like iBook was released in 1999. Since then, the company has continued this strategy of differentiating the consumer versus professional product lines. Apple's focus on design has allowed each of its subsequent products to create a distinctive identity. Apple avoided using the beige colors that were then common in the PC industry. The company would later drift from the multicolored designs of the late 1990s and early 2000s. The latter part of the decade saw Apple using anodized aluminum; glass; and white, black, and clear polycarbonate plastics among its build materials. Many PCs are more design-conscious than before the iMac's introduction, with multi-shaded design schemes being common, and some desktops and laptops available in colorful, decorative patterns.

Apple's use of translucent, candy-colored plastics inspired similar industrial designs in other consumer products. Apple's later introduction of the iPod, iBook G3 (Dual USB), and iMac G4 (all featuring snowy-white plastic), inspired similar designs in other companies' consumer electronics products. The color rollout also featured two distinctive ads: one called "Life Savers" featured the Rolling Stones song, "She's a Rainbow" and an advertisement for the white version had the introduction of Cream's "White Room" as its backing track.

The iMac won several design competitions and awards, including Gold at the 1999 D&AD Design Awards in the UK, and "Object of the Year" by The Face. Various iMac models are held in the collections of museums including the Henry Ford, the Victoria and Albert Museum, the Powerhouse Museum, and the Museum of Modern Art.

== Reception ==
iMac has received considerable critical acclaim, including praise from technology columnist Walt Mossberg as the "Gold Standard of desktop computing"; Forbes magazine described the original candy-colored line of iMac computers as being an "industry-altering success". The first 24-inch Core 2 Duo iMac received CNET's "Must-have desktop" in its 2006 Top 10 Holiday Gift Picks.

Apple faced a class-action lawsuit filed in 2008 for allegedly deceiving the public by promising millions of colors from the LCD screens of all Mac models while its 20-inch model only held 262,144 colors. This issue arose due to the use of 6-bit-per-pixel twisted nematic LCD screens. The case was dismissed on January 21, 2009.

While not a criticism of iMac per se, the integrated design has some inherent tradeoffs that have garnered criticism. In The Mythical Midrange Mac Minitower, Dan Frakes of Macworld suggests that with the iMac occupying the midrange of Apple's product line, Apple has little to offer consumers who want some ability to expand or upgrade their computers, but do not need (or cannot afford) the Mac Pro. For example, iMac's integration of monitor and computer, while convenient, commits the owner to replace both at the same time. For a time before the Mac Mini's introduction, there were rumors of a "headless iMac" but the G4 Mac Mini as introduced had lower performance compared to the iMac, which at the time featured a G5 processor. Some third-party suppliers such as Other World Computing provide upgrade kits that include specialized tools for working on iMacs.

Similarly, though the graphics chipset in some Intel models is on a removable MXM, neither Apple nor third parties have offered retail iMac GPU upgrades, with the exception of those for the original iMac G3's "mezzanine" PCI slot. Models after iMac G5 made it difficult for the end-user to replace the hard disk or optical drive, and Apple's warranty explicitly forbids upgrading the socketed CPU. While conceding the possibility of a mini-tower cannibalizing sales from the Mac Pro, Frakes argues there is enough frustration with iMac's limitations to make such a proposition worthwhile. This disparity has become more pronounced after the G4 era since the bottom-end Power Mac G5 (with one brief exception) and Mac Pro models have all been priced in the US$1999–2499 range, while base model Power Mac G4 models and earlier were US$1299–1799. It is possible to upgrade the 2010 edition of the iMac quite easily.

== Timeline ==
Generation	Form factor	Display	Processor	Included storage	Included Mac OS version	Released	Discontinued
iMac G3	Slot loading iMac G3.	15 in (380 mm) CRT	PowerPC G3	4 GB to 60 GB HDD	8.1, 8.5, 8.6, 9.0, 9.1, 10.0, 10.1, 10.2	August 15, 1998	March 2003
iMac G4	iMac G4 Sunflower.	15 in (380 mm), 17 in (430 mm), or 20 in (510 mm) LCD	PowerPC G4	40 GB to 160 GB HDD	9.2, 10.1, 10.2, 10.3	January 2002	July 2004
iMac G5	iMac G5 Rev A.	17 in (430 mm) or 20 in (510 mm) LCD	PowerPC G5	40 GB to 500 GB HDD	10.3, 10.4	August 2004	March 2006
Polycarbonate Intel iMac	Polycarbonate iMac.	17 in (430 mm), 20 in (510 mm), or 24 in (610 mm) LCD	Intel Core Duo or Core 2 Duo	80 GB to 750 GB HDD	10.4	January 2006	August 2007
Aluminum iMac	Aluminium iMac.	20 in (510 mm) or 24 in (610 mm) LCD	Intel Core 2 Duo	250 GB to 1 TB HDD	10.4, 10.5, 10.6	August 2007	August 2011
Unibody iMac	Unibody iMac.	21.5 in (550 mm) or 27 in (690 mm) LCD	Intel Core 2 Duo, i3, i5, or i7	256 GB SSD to 2 TB HDD	10.6, 10.7, 10.8	October 2009	March 2013
Slim Unibody iMac	Slim edge unibody iMac.	21.5 in (550 mm) or 27 in (690 mm) LCD	Intel Core i3, i5, or i7	256 GB SSD to 3 TB HDD	10.8, 10.9, 10.10, 10.11, 10.12, 10.13, 10.14, 10.15, 11	November 2012	October 2021
Retina iMac	Retina iMac.	21.5 in (550 mm) or 27 in (690 mm) LCD	Intel Core i3, i5, i7, or i9	256 GB SSD to 3 TB HDD	10.10, 10.11, 10.12, 10.13, 10.14, 10.15, 11, 12	October 2014	March 2022
iMac (Apple silicon)		24 in (610 mm) LCD	Apple M-series	256 GB to 2 TB SSD	11, 12, 13, 14, 15, 26, 27	April 2021	—N/a

Timeline of iMac and eMac models
See also: List of Mac models

== Supported operating systems ==
=== Supported Apple operating system releases ===
As of October 2026, macOS Golden Gate is the current release of macOS, being compatible with 2021 or later iMacs. Most unsupported Intel iMac computers can run macOS Sequoia or macOS Tahoe via the use of a compatible utility.

Supported macOS releases on iMac
OS release	PowerPC-based													Intel-based																					Apple silicon			
OS release	G3 (Tray Loading)		G3 (Slot Loading)				G4				G5			Intel (Polycarbonate)			Aluminum				Unibody				Slim Unibody				Retina						Colors			
OS release	Original (Mid 1998)	Early 1999	Late 1999	Mid 2000	Early 2001	Mid 2001	Early 2002 15"	Mid 2002 17"	Early 2003	Late 2003	Mid 2004	Mid 2005	Late 2005	Early 2006	Mid 2006	Late 2006	Mid 2007	Early 2008	Early 2009	Mid 2009	Late 2009	Mid 2010	Mid 2011	Late 2011	Late 2012	Early 2013	Late 2013	Mid 2014	Late 2014	Mid 2015	Late 2015 (Note: Includes 21.5-inch non-Retina models released in the same date.)	2017	2019	2020	M1, 2021	M3, 2023	M4, 2024	M6, 2026
Mac OS 8	8.1 (Note: Revision A model.); 8.5 (Note: Revision B model.)	8.5.1	8.6	—N/a	—N/a	—N/a	—N/a	—N/a	—N/a	—N/a	—N/a	—N/a	—N/a	—N/a	—N/a	—N/a	—N/a	—N/a	—N/a	—N/a	—N/a	—N/a	—N/a	—N/a	—N/a	—N/a	—N/a	—N/a	—N/a	—N/a	—N/a	—N/a	—N/a	—N/a	—N/a	—N/a	—N/a	—N/a
Mac OS 9	Yes	Yes	Yes	9.0.4	9.1		9.2.2		Emulation only					—N/a	—N/a	—N/a	—N/a	—N/a	—N/a	—N/a	—N/a	—N/a	—N/a	—N/a	—N/a	—N/a	—N/a	—N/a	—N/a	—N/a	—N/a	—N/a	—N/a	—N/a	—N/a	—N/a	—N/a	—N/a
10.0 Cheetah	With 128 MB RAM					10.0.4	—N/a	—N/a	—N/a	—N/a	—N/a	—N/a	—N/a	—N/a	—N/a	—N/a	—N/a	—N/a	—N/a	—N/a	—N/a	—N/a	—N/a	—N/a	—N/a	—N/a	—N/a	—N/a	—N/a	—N/a	—N/a	—N/a	—N/a	—N/a	—N/a	—N/a	—N/a	—N/a
10.1 Puma	With 128 MB RAM					Yes	10.1.2	10.1.5	—N/a	—N/a	—N/a	—N/a	—N/a	—N/a	—N/a	—N/a	—N/a	—N/a	—N/a	—N/a	—N/a	—N/a	—N/a	—N/a	—N/a	—N/a	—N/a	—N/a	—N/a	—N/a	—N/a	—N/a	—N/a	—N/a	—N/a	—N/a	—N/a	—N/a
10.2 Jaguar	With 128 MB RAM					Yes	Yes	Yes	10.2.3	10.2.7 (Note: 15-inch and 17-inch models. 20-inch model can still run Mac OS X Jaguar.)	—N/a	—N/a	—N/a	—N/a	—N/a	—N/a	—N/a	—N/a	—N/a	—N/a	—N/a	—N/a	—N/a	—N/a	—N/a	—N/a	—N/a	—N/a	—N/a	—N/a	—N/a	—N/a	—N/a	—N/a	—N/a	—N/a	—N/a	—N/a
10.3 Panther	With 128 MB RAM					Yes	Yes	Yes	Yes	Yes (Note: 20-inch model.)	10.3.5	—N/a	—N/a	—N/a	—N/a	—N/a	—N/a	—N/a	—N/a	—N/a	—N/a	—N/a	—N/a	—N/a	—N/a	—N/a	—N/a	—N/a	—N/a	—N/a	—N/a	—N/a	—N/a	—N/a	—N/a	—N/a	—N/a	—N/a
10.4 Tiger	Patch, With 256 MB RAM		With 256 MB RAM						Yes	Yes	Yes	Yes	10.4.2	10.4.4	10.4.6	10.4.7	10.4.10	Partial	—N/a	—N/a	—N/a	—N/a	—N/a	—N/a	—N/a	—N/a	—N/a	—N/a	—N/a	—N/a	—N/a	—N/a	—N/a	—N/a	—N/a	—N/a	—N/a	—N/a
10.5 Leopard	Patch, With G4 processor upgrade and 384 MB or 512 MB RAM						Patch, With 512 MB RAM		Patch (Note: 15-inch model requires patches.); With 512 MB RAM	With 512 MB RAM			Yes	Yes	Yes	Yes	Yes	10.5.2	10.5.6		—N/a	—N/a	—N/a	—N/a	—N/a	—N/a	—N/a	—N/a	—N/a	—N/a	—N/a	—N/a	—N/a	—N/a	—N/a	—N/a	—N/a	—N/a
10.6 Snow Leopard	No	No	No	No	No	No	No	No	No	No	No	No	No	With 1 GB RAM			Yes	Yes	Yes	Yes	10.6.1	10.6.3	10.6.6	Unofficial	—N/a	—N/a	—N/a	—N/a	—N/a	—N/a	—N/a	—N/a	—N/a	—N/a	—N/a	—N/a	—N/a	—N/a
10.7 Lion	No	No	No	No	No	No	No	No	No	No	No	No	No	Patch, With 2 GB RAM (Note: Up to 10.7.3 with patches or 10.7.5 with no Wi-Fi.)		With 2 GB RAM					Yes	Yes	Yes	Yes	—N/a	—N/a	—N/a	—N/a	—N/a	—N/a	—N/a	—N/a	—N/a	—N/a	—N/a	—N/a	—N/a	—N/a
10.8 Mountain Lion	No	No	No	No	No	No	No	No	No	No	No	No	No	Patch, With 2 GB RAM (Note: Requires a Merom processor upgrade.)		Patch, With 2 GB RAM	With 2 GB RAM				Yes	Yes	Yes	Yes	10.8.2		10.8.4	—N/a	—N/a	—N/a	—N/a	—N/a	—N/a	—N/a	—N/a	—N/a	—N/a	—N/a
10.9 Mavericks	No	No	No	No	No	No	No	No	No	No	No	No	No	Patch, With 2 GB RAM	Patch, With 2 GB RAM (Note: There are no graphics drivers available for the GMA 950 after OS X Mountain Lion.)	Patch, With 2 GB RAM (Note: There are no graphics drivers available for the NVIDIA GeForce 7 Series after OS X Mountain Lion.)	With 2 GB RAM				Yes	Yes	Yes	Yes	Yes	Yes	Yes	10.9.3	—N/a	—N/a	—N/a	—N/a	—N/a	—N/a	—N/a	—N/a	—N/a	—N/a
10.10 Yosemite	No	No	No	No	No	No	No	No	No	No	No	No	No	Patch, With 2 GB RAM (Note: There are no graphics drivers available for the ATI Radeon X1600 after OS X Mavericks.)	Patch, With 2 GB RAM	Patch, With 2 GB RAM	With 2 GB RAM				Yes	Yes	Yes	Yes	Yes	Yes	Yes	Yes	Yes	10.10.2	—N/a	—N/a	—N/a	—N/a	—N/a	—N/a	—N/a	—N/a
10.11 El Capitan	No	No	No	No	No	No	No	No	No	No	No	No	No	Patch, With 2 GB RAM	Patch, With 2 GB RAM	Patch, With 2 GB RAM	With 2 GB RAM				Yes	Yes	Yes	Yes	Yes	Yes	Yes	Yes	Yes	Yes	Yes	—N/a	—N/a	—N/a	—N/a	—N/a	—N/a	—N/a
10.12 Sierra	No	No	No	No	No	No	No	No	No	No	No	No	No	No	No	No	Patch, With 2 GB RAM (Note: Requires a Penryn processor upgrade with SSE4 support.)	Patch, With 2 GB RAM			Yes	Yes	Yes	Yes	Yes	Yes	Yes	Yes	Yes	Yes	Yes	10.12.4	—N/a	—N/a	—N/a	—N/a	—N/a	—N/a
10.13 High Sierra	No	No	No	No	No	No	No	No	No	No	No	No	No	No	No	No	Patch, With 2 GB RAM	Patch, With 2 GB RAM			Yes	Yes	Yes	Yes	Yes	Yes	Yes	Yes	Yes	Yes	Yes	Yes	—N/a	—N/a	—N/a	—N/a	—N/a	—N/a
10.14 Mojave	No	No	No	No	No	No	No	No	No	No	No	No	No	No	No	No	Patch, With 2 GB RAM	Patch, With 2 GB RAM			Patch				Yes	Yes	Yes	Yes	Yes	Yes	Yes	Yes	10.14.4	—N/a	—N/a	—N/a	—N/a	—N/a
10.15 Catalina	No	No	No	No	No	No	No	No	No	No	No	No	No	No	No	No	Patch, With 4 GB RAM (Note: No Bluetooth on macOS Big Sur and later.)	Patch, With 4 GB RAM			Patch			Patch, With 4 GB RAM	Yes	Yes	Yes	Yes	Yes	Yes	Yes	Yes	Yes	10.15.6	—N/a	—N/a	—N/a	—N/a
11 Big Sur	No	No	No	No	No	No	No	No	No	No	No	No	No	No	No	No	Patch, With 4 GB RAM	Patch, With 4 GB RAM			Patch			Patch, With 4 GB RAM	Patch			Yes	Yes	Yes	Yes	Yes	Yes	Yes	11.3	—N/a	—N/a	—N/a
12 Monterey	No	No	No	No	No	No	No	No	No	No	No	No	No	No	No	No	Patch, With 4 GB RAM	Patch, With 4 GB RAM			Patch			Patch, With 4 GB RAM	Patch						Yes	Yes	Yes	Yes	Yes	—N/a	—N/a	—N/a
13 Ventura	No	No	No	No	No	No	No	No	No	No	No	No	No	No	No	No	Patch, With 4 GB RAM	Patch, With 4 GB RAM			Patch			Patch, With 4 GB RAM	Patch							Yes	Yes	Yes	Yes	13.5	—N/a	—N/a
14 Sonoma	No	No	No	No	No	No	No	No	No	No	No	No	No	No	No	No	Patch, With 4 GB RAM	Patch, With 4 GB RAM			Patch			Patch, With 4 GB RAM	Patch								Yes	Yes	Yes	Yes	—N/a	—N/a
15 Sequoia	No	No	No	No	No	No	No	No	No	No	No	No	No	No	No	No	Patch, With 4 GB RAM	Patch, With 4 GB RAM			Patch			Patch, With 4 GB RAM	Patch								Yes	Yes	Yes	Yes	Yes	—N/a
26 Tahoe	No	No	No	No	No	No	No	No	No	No	No	No	No	No	No	No	Patch, With 4 GB RAM	Patch, With 4 GB RAM			Patch			Patch, With 4 GB RAM	Patch								No	Yes	Yes	Yes	Yes	—N/a
27 Golden Gate	No	No	No	No	No	No	No	No	No	No	No	No	No	No	No	No	No	No	No	No	No	No	No	No	No	No	No	No	No	No	No	No	No	No	Yes	Yes	Yes	27.2

=== Supported Windows versions (Intel models only) ===
Supported Windows versions
OS release		Polycarbonate		Aluminum	Unibody			Slim Unibody	Retina		
OS release		Early 2006	Mid-2006 – early 2009		Late 2009	Mid 2010	Mid 2011	Late 2012 – mid-2015		Late 2015	2017–2020
Windows XP (Note: Windows XP can only be installed on Macs built up until late 2009 with Boot Camp 3 or earlier, excluding the late 2009 high-end 27-inch model. This includes Mac OS X 10.6 or earlier and copies of Mac OS X 10.7 that have not been updated to Boot Camp 4.)		Yes	Yes	Yes	Partial	Emulation only					
Windows Vista	32-bit (Note: Windows Vista can only be installed on Macs built up until late 2009 with Boot Camp 3 or earlier, excluding the late 2009 high-end 27-inch model. This includes Mac OS X 10.6 or earlier and copies of Mac OS X 10.7 that have not been updated to Boot Camp 4.)	Yes	Yes	Yes	Partial	Emulation only					
Windows Vista	64-bit	Yes	Yes	Yes	Partial	Emulation only					
Windows 7	32-bit (Note: The 32-bit version of Windows 7 can only be installed on Macs with Boot Camp 3.1 to 6.0. This includes OS X 10.11 and earlier.)	No	Yes	Yes	Yes	Yes	Yes	Emulation only			
Windows 7	64-bit (Note: The 64-bit version of Windows 7 can only be installed on Macs with Boot Camp 3.1 or later, running macOS High Sierra or earlier. Later versions of macOS no longer support Windows 7.)	No	No	No	Yes	Yes	Yes	Yes	Yes	Emulation only	
Windows 8 (Note: Windows 8 can only be installed on Macs with Boot Camp 5.0 to 6.0. This includes OS X 10.11 and earlier.) (Note: Only 64-bit versions of Windows are supported for Windows 8 and later.)		No	No	No	No	Partial, Patch (Note: Only the 27-inch model of the mid-2010 iMac supports Windows 8 and 8.1. The 21.5-inch model is not supported.)	Yes	Yes	Yes	Yes	Emulation only
Windows 8.1 (Note: Windows 8.1 can only be installed on Macs with Boot Camp 5.1 or later, running macOS High Sierra or earlier. Later versions of macOS no longer support Windows 8.1.)		No	No	No	No	Partial, Patch	Yes	Yes	Yes	Yes	Emulation only
Windows 10 (Note: Windows 10 can only be installed on Macs with Boot Camp 6.0 or later. It is the only supported version of Windows on macOS Mojave and later.) (Note: Windows 10 or 11 can unofficially be installed in UEFI mode on unsupported Macs using OpenCore Legacy Boot Patcher (OCLP).)		No	No	No	No	Patch	Patch	Yes	Yes	Yes	Yes
Windows 11 (Note: Windows 11 is not officially supported for use via Boot Camp by either Apple or Microsoft.)		No	No	No	No	Patch	Patch	Patch	Partial	Yes	Yes
