= IOS 11 =

2017 mobile operating system

iOS 11
- Version of the iOS operating system

- iOS 11 home screen on an iPhone X
- Developer: Apple
- Working state: No longer supported
- Source model: Closed, with open-source components
- Initial release: September 19, 2017; 9 years ago
- Latest release: 11.4.1 (15G77) (July 9, 2018; 8 years ago) [±]
- Update method: Software Update
- Package manager: App Store
- Supported platforms: iPhone, iPod Touch, iPad
- Kernel type: Hybrid (XNU)
- License: Proprietary software with open-source components
- Preceded by: iOS 10
- Succeeded by: iOS 12
- Official website: iOS 11 - Apple at the Wayback Machine (archived August 28, 2018)
- Tagline: A giant step for iPhone. A monumental leap for iPad.

Support status
- Obsolete, unsupported

iOS 11 is the eleventh major release of the iOS mobile operating system developed by Apple, being the successor to iOS 10. It was announced at the company's Worldwide Developers Conference on June 5, 2017, and was released on September 19, 2017. It was succeeded by iOS 12 on September 17, 2018.

== Overview ==
iOS 11 was introduced at the Apple Worldwide Developers Conference keynote address on June 5, 2017. The first developer beta version was released after the keynote presentation, with the first public beta released on June 26, 2017.

iOS 11 was officially released by Apple on September 19, 2017. It brought many changes to iOS. Some major highlights were:

- The lock screen and Notification Center were combined, allowing all notifications to be displayed directly on the lock screen.
- The control center was completely redesigned, combining all pages into a single unified page. It also brought the ability to rearrange the position of the controls, some of which could be used with 3D Touch for quick access to additional options.
- The App Store received its first major design overhaul since iOS 7 to focus on editorial content and daily highlights.
- A "Files" file manager app allowed access to files stored locally on-device and in iCloud and other cloud services. With this addition, users could also for the first time save files downloaded using Safari right on their iPhone without any third-party apps.
- Siri was updated to translate between languages and use a privacy-minded "on-device learning" technique to better understand a user's interests and offer suggestions.
- The camera introduced new settings for improved portrait-mode photos and utilized new encoding technologies to reduce file sizes on newer devices.
- In a later release of iOS 11, Messages was integrated with iCloud to better synchronize messages across iOS and macOS devices. A previous point release also added support for person-to-person Apple Pay payments.
- It introduced the ability to record the screen, which could be enabled by adding it to the control center in Settings.
- It also introduced rudimentary forms of drag-and-drop functionality.
- Support for augmented reality. Allowing users to "place" virtual objects in the real world and interact with them using their iPhone.

Certain new features are only available on iPad. Some of these features are:

- An always-accessible application dock that could be access by dragging up from the bottom of the screen.
- Cross-app drag-and-drop allowing users to share photos, files, and links easier than ever.
- Adding a new easier way to split-screen apps by simply dragging an app from the dock on to another already open app. The "split" could then be resized to make one app bigger or small depending on what the user wanted.

iOS 11 is the first version of iOS that does not support 32-bit apps or 32-bit processors. It therefore only supports 64-bit apps or 64-bit processors. (32-bit apps must be updated to 64-bit.) When installing iOS 11, if a user tries to open a 32-bit app that has not yet been updated to 64-bit, iOS will simply refuse to run it. iOS 10.3 includes a popup upon launching a 32-bit application to warn users about the upcoming change and a new menu in Settings that allowed users to quickly identify what apps on their device will not be compatible with the iOS 11 update. iOS 11 makes it the second iOS version to drop just one iPad model's support. In this case, the iPad 4.

== System features ==
=== Lock screen ===
The lock screen and Notification Center are redesigned into one, allowing users to see all notifications directly on the lock screen. Scrolling up and down will either show or hide notifications. Opening on the Lock Screen on the iPhone X is now done by swiping up.

=== Control Center ===
The default Control Center on an iPhone 7 Plus

The Control Center has been given another redesign after its short lived one from iOS 10, as it receives new unified pages and now supports 3D Touch (or a long press on devices without 3D Touch) buttons for more options. Sliders adjust volume and brightness. The Control Center is now customizable, and allows more settings to be shown, including cellular service, Low Power Mode, and a shortcut to the Notes app.

=== Siri ===
The Siri intelligent personal assistant has a more human voice and supports language translation, with English, Chinese, French, German, Italian and Spanish available at launch. It also supports follow-up questions by users. Users are also able to type to Siri.

Siri is able to use "on-device learning", a privacy-minded local learning technique to understand a user's behavior and interests inside different apps, to offer better suggestions and recommendations.

=== Settings ===
A new "Do Not Disturb While Driving" mode lets users block unnecessary notifications as long as their iPhone is connected to a vehicle through Bluetooth. An auto-reply feature sends a specific reply to senders of messages to let them know the user is currently unavailable through text. Passengers can be granted full notification access to the phone.

A new "Smart Invert" feature, dubbed a "dark mode" by some publications, inverts the colors on the display, except for images, some apps, and some user interface elements. Using the iPhone X, which utilizes OLED technology, some news outlets have reported that this feature can conserve battery life by turning off pixels when black, saving energy by preventing itself from displaying a white pixel.

Users get expanded control over apps' location usage, with every app featuring a "While Using the App" location toggle in Settings. This differs from previous iOS versions, in which apps were only required to have "Never" or "Always" location options.

Users can remove rarely used apps without losing the app's data using the "Offload App" button. This allows for a later reinstallation of the app (if available on the App Store), in which data returns and usage can continue. Users can also have those apps removed automatically with the "Offload Unused Apps" setting. When an app is offloaded, the app appears on the home screen as a grayed-out icon.

Storage settings on an iPhone 6S Plus, showing personalized recommendations

Personalized suggestions will help the user free up storage space on their device, including emptying Photos trash, backing up messages, and enabling iCloud Photo Library for backing up photos and videos.

=== iPad ===
Multitasking interface on a 9.7-inch iPad Pro

Certain new iOS 11 features are only available on the iPad. The application dock gets an overhaul, bringing it closer to the design seen on macOS, and is accessible from any screen, letting users more easily open apps in split-screen view. Users can also drag-and-drop files across different apps. A new multitasking interface shows multiple apps on the screen at the same time in floating "windows." Additionally, through a combination of "slide over," "split view," and "picture-in-picture" modes, users can have up to four active apps on-screen at the same time.

Each letter on the iPad keyboard features an alternative background number or symbol, accessible by pulling down on the respective key and releasing.

The Control Center is visible in the multitasking window on iPads.

Running iOS 11, the 9.7-inch, 10.5-inch and the 2nd-generation 12.9-inch iPad Pros now have flashlight support.

=== Camera ===
iOS 11 introduces optical image stabilization, flash photography and high dynamic range for portrait photos.

Live Photos receives new "Loop", "Bounce" and "Long Exposure" effects, and uses High Efficiency Image File Format to decrease photo sizes.

On devices with an Apple A10 chip or newer, photos can be compressed in the new High Efficiency Image File Format and videos can be encoded in the new High Efficiency Video Coding video compression format, enabling improved quality while also decreasing size by half.

=== Wallpapers ===
Apple significantly changed the wallpapers available for use with iOS 11. In the initial beta version, released after Apple's developer conference, Apple included one new wallpaper, and removed all the six "Live" animated fish wallpapers, introduced with the iPhone 6S in 2015. The iOS 11.2 release later brought iPhone X/8/8 Plus-exclusive wallpapers to older iPhones.

iPhone X exclusively features six "Live" wallpapers and seven new "Dynamic" wallpapers.

=== Other changes ===
The default system keyboard, in one-handed mode, on an iPhone 7 Plus

iOS 11 introduces native support for QR code scanning, through the Camera app. Once a QR code is positioned in front of the camera, a notification is created offering suggestions for actions based on the scanned content. Twitter users have so far discovered that joining Wi-Fi networks and adding someone to the contacts list are supported through QR codes.

Third-party keyboards can add a one-handed mode.

Users are able to record the screen natively. In order to record the screen, users must first add the feature to the Control Center through the Settings app. Once added, users can start and stop recordings from a dedicated Control Center icon, with a distinctly colored bar appearing at the top of the screen indicating active recording. Pressing the bar gives the option to end recording, and videos are saved to the Photos app.

When an iOS 11 device is attempting to connect to a Wi-Fi network, nearby iOS 11 or macOS High Sierra devices already connected can wirelessly send the password, streamlining the connection process.

The volume change overlay no longer covers the screen while playing video, and a smaller scrubber appears on the top right of the screen.

After a user takes a screenshot, a thumbnail of the screenshot will appear at the bottom left of the screen. The user can then tap the thumbnail to bring up an interface that allows them to crop, annotate, or delete the screenshot.

Third-party apps are also able to take advantage of iCloud Keychain to allow autofilling passwords.

The user's airline flight information can be viewed in Spotlight through a dedicated widget.

iOS 11 switches the top-left cellular network strength icons from five dots to four signal bars, similar to that before iOS 7.

A new automatic setup feature called "Quick Start" aims to simplify the first-time setup of new devices, with wireless transfer between the old and new device, transferring preferences, Apple ID and Wi-Fi info, preferred Settings, and iCloud Keychain passwords.

Similar to iPad, drag-and-drop file support is available on iPhone, though with more limitations, specifically only supported within apps, not between.

Many of Apple's pre-installed applications, including Notes, Contacts, Reminders, Maps, and App Store, have redesigned home screen icons.

An "Emergency SOS" feature was added that disables Touch ID after pressing the Sleep/Wake button five times in quick succession. It prevents Touch ID from working until the iPhone's passcode has been entered.

iOS 11 adds support for 8-bit and 10-bit HEVC. Devices with an Apple A9 chip or newer support hardware decoding, while older devices support software-based decoding.

When a device running iOS 11 or later is activated, Apple's verification server will check the device's UDID before it could be set up. If the device's UDID is malformed or not present in Apple's database, the device cannot be activated and will be denied access to the verification server. If said device is connected to iTunes, an error message will appear stating that the iPhone could not be activated because "the activation information could not be obtained from the device.

== App features ==
=== Mail ===
Where there is empty space in the Mail app, users can draw inline.

=== Messages ===
The Messages application synchronizes messages across iOS and macOS through iCloud, reflecting message deletion across devices. This feature was temporarily removed in the fifth beta release and returned on May 29, 2018 when iOS 11.4 was released.

At the time of the iOS 11 announcement in June 2017, Apple presented functionality letting users send person-to-person payments with Apple Pay through Messages. By the time of the iOS 11 release in September 2017, the feature was not present, having been removed in an earlier beta version, with Apple announcing the feature as "coming this fall with an update to iOS 11". It was launched a few days after the iOS 11.2 update went live, although initially only available in the United States.

A new app drawer for iMessage apps aims to simplify the experience of using apps and stickers, and an optimized storage system reduces the backup size of messages.

The Messages app also incorporates a "Business Chat" feature for businesses to communicate directly with customers through the app. This can be accessed through a message icon next to search results of businesses. However, this feature was not included with the initial release of iOS 11 (instead launching with iOS 11.3).

The Messages app on the iPhone X introduces face-tracking emoji called "Animoji" (animated emoji), using Face ID.

=== App Store ===
The "Apps" tab in the App Store on an iPhone 7 Plus

In addition to a new logo, The App Store receives a complete redesign, with a greater focus on editorial content such as daily highlights, and a design described as "cleaner and more consistent" to other apps developed by Apple. The app's design mimics the design seen in the Apple Music app in iOS 10.

=== Maps ===
At select locations, Apple Maps will offer indoor maps for shopping malls and airports.

New lane guidance and speed limit features aim to guide drivers on unfamiliar roads.

=== Photos ===
The Photos app in iOS 11 gains support for viewing animated GIFs. Users can access GIF images inside an album titled "Animated".

Memories can be viewed while the phone is in portrait orientation.

=== Podcasts ===
The Podcasts app receives a redesign similar to the App Store, with a focus on editorial content.

=== Notes ===
The Notes app has a built-in document scanner using the device's camera, and the feature removes artifacts such as glare and perspective.

An "Instant Notes" feature on the iPad Pro allows the user to start writing a note from the lock screen by putting the Apple Pencil onto the screen.

The app also allows users to input inline tables.

Where there is open space in the Notes app, the user can draw inline.

=== Files ===
The layout of the "Files" app on an iPad

Replacing the dedicated iCloud drive app, a new Files app lets users browse the files stored on their device, as well as those stored across various cloud services, including iCloud Drive, Dropbox, OneDrive, and Google Drive. The app supports organization through structured sub-folders and various file-based options, and it also includes a built-in player for FLAC audio files. The Files app is available on both iPad and iPhone.

=== Safari ===
The user's flight information can be found in the Safari app.

=== TV ===
The Apple TV app gradually replaced the videos app in iOS 11 in other regions, rather than only the US like previously. For instance, in the minor update iOS 11.2, this change was implemented for United Kingdom users.

=== Calculator ===
The Calculator app receives a redesign, with rounded buttons, replacing the grid ones seen on iOS 7.

== Developer APIs ==
A new "ARKit" application programming interface (API) lets third-party developers build augmented reality apps, taking advantage of a device's camera, CPU, GPU, and motion sensors. The ARKit functionality is only available to users of devices with Apple A9 and later processors. According to Apple, this is because "these processors deliver breakthrough performance that enables fast scene understanding and lets you build detailed and compelling virtual content on top of real-world scenes."

A new "Core ML" software framework will speed up app tasks involving artificial intelligence, such as image recognition.

A new "Depth" API allows third-party camera app developers to take advantage of the iPhone 7 Plus, iPhone 8 Plus, and iPhone X's dual-camera "Portrait mode". This will let apps implement the same depth-sensing technology available in the default iOS Camera app, to simulate a shallow depth-of-field.

A new "Core NFC" framework gives developers limited access to the near field communication (NFC) chip inside supported iPhones, opening potential use cases in which apps can scan nearby environments and give users more information.

== Removed functionality ==
Starting with iOS 11, Apple requires all applications to be compiled for 64-bit architecture. Consequently, 32-bit apps are completely unsupported, omitted from App Store search results, and rendered inoperable. Users who attempt to launch these legacy applications are met with a system alert stating that the app requires an update to function.

iOS 11 removes the native system integration with Twitter, Facebook, Flickr, and Vimeo.

The ability to trigger multitasking using 3D Touch was removed from the original iOS 11 release. In response to a bug report, an Apple engineer wrote that "Please know that this feature was intentionally removed". Apple's software engineering chief Craig Federighi wrote in reply to an email that the company had to "temporarily drop support" due to a "technical constraint," pledging to bring it back in a future update to iOS 11. It was brought back in iOS 11.1.

In iOS 11.2, the toggles for Wi-Fi and Bluetooth in Control Center were unexpectedly altered to only turn them off temporarily, until the next day. The only way to turn them off permanently was in the Settings app.

== Reception ==
iOS 11 received mixed reviews. Critics praised the application dock and new multitasking interface on the iPad, crediting them for renewing the user experience. Further praise was directed at the redesigned Control Center offering customizable toggles; criticism was widely focused on its lack of third-party app support, lack of Wi-Fi network selection ability and for difficult usage on small screen sizes, along with its instability. Critics also noted the new augmented reality development tools, but said their impact would depend on third-party apps and how fast developers embraced them. Praise was also directed at the App Store's redesign and the new file-management tools. Shortly after release, it was discovered that disabling Wi-Fi and Bluetooth connections through the Control Center does not disable the respective chips in the device in order to remain functional for background connectivity, a design decision sparking criticism for "misleading" users and reducing security due to potential vulnerabilities in inactive open connections. The iOS 11.2 update added warning messages and a new toggle color to explain the new functions. iOS 11 has also received continuous criticism from critics and end-users for its perceived stability and performance issues, particularly on older devices; Apple has issued numerous software updates to address such issues and has dedicated iOS 12 mainly toward stability and performance improvements in response. Two months after release, 52% of iOS devices were running iOS 11, a slower adoption rate than previous iOS versions. The number increased to 85% of devices by September 2018.

Dieter Bohn of The Verge liked the new Control Center setup, including customizable toggles and 3D Touch-expandable options, writing that "there are a few panels that I'm really impressed with", specifically highlighting the Apple TV remote as a possible replacement of the normal remote. He did, however, note the lack of third-party access to Control Center, with a hope for support in the future, and a lack of Wi-Fi network selection ability. He praised the screen-recording functionality, calling it "super neat". Bohn severely criticized the notifications view, writing that he has a "very serious disagreement" with Apple on how to manage it, elaborating that he prefers to use that screen as much as possible while stating that "Apple's philosophy is that I'm trying way too hard" to control speedy notifications. Bohn liked the new Files app, new drag-and-drop functionality on the home screen enabling users to drag multiple apps at once, and significantly praised multitasking on iPad. Writing that "Multitasking on the iPad is a near-revelatory experience", he enjoyed the application dock and the ability to place up to three apps on the screen at once with more freedom on placement. Bohn conceded that "It's not as intuitive nor as simple nor [sic] as easy to manipulate as a traditional windowing system like you'll get on a Mac, PC, or Chromebook", but still praised it for being "radically more powerful than what has ever been available on an iPad before". Finally, Bohn praised Siri for improvements to the voice, highlighted augmented reality allowing for "incredible games", and reiterated an earlier sentiment that iOS 11 is "the most ambitious software update from Apple in a very, very long time".

Macworld's Jason Snell wrote that the hype surrounding iOS 11 is "justified". Snell praised the new "smoother" transfer mode of data and settings between an old iPhone and a new iPhone, referring to the previous experience of doing it manually as "a frustrating exercise in entering in passwords repeatedly while tapping through a long series of questions about activating or deactivating numerous iOS features." He also praised the Control Center design, calling it "a great upgrade", though also highlighting the inability to easily switch Wi-Fi networks. Snell noted that the App Store's design had been unchanged for years, but received a full redesign in iOS 11, and wrote that Apple's commitment to editorial pages was "impressive", making the App Store "a richer, more fun experience." Regarding the introduction of augmented reality, he stated that most apps using it were "bad", though some also "mind-blowingly good," adding that the "huge potential" depended on how third-party apps were using it. Snell also praised improvements to the iPad experience, including multitasking and drag-and-drop across apps, the latter of which he stated "actually surpasses my expectations" due to ease of use. His review summarization states that iOS 11 is "Apple's most ambitious and impressive upgrade in years."

Romain Dillet of TechCrunch focused mostly on the iPad in his review, writing that iOS 11 "turns your iPad into a completely different machine", with "much more efficient" multitasking and improved ease of access with the application dock. He also praised the design overhaul of the App Store, calling it "a huge improvement compared to the previous App Store", and also highlighted design changes in other apps, including "a huge bold header with the name of the app or section". Although he acknowledged that "Many tech friends have told me that they hate this change," Dillet stated that "I think most people will like it. It's visually pleasing and distinctive." He stated that augmented reality will become more relevant in the days following the iOS 11 release as third-party developers incorporate features into their apps, and praised Apple for creating the ARKit development tools as it "makes it much easier to implement augmented reality features". In conclusion, Dillet wrote that "Ten years ago, iOS started as a constrained operating system. It is now one of the biggest digital playgrounds".

Devindra Hardawar of Engadget stated that the focus of iOS 11 was "all about transforming iOS into something more desktop-like", with many enhancements for iPad while "leaving the iPhone a bit behind." He had mixed feelings about the Control Center, writing that, on small phone screen sizes, it "feels like a jumbled mess," and adding that true comfort may only be present with larger screens, a troubling situation for owners of non-Plus devices. However, he praised the ability to customize the buttons, including removing those the user never uses, and the ability to quickly record the screen or enable accessibility features. He called the new app designs "attractive", and favorably pointed out the new app drawer at the bottom of conversations in the Messages app, referring to it as "a big improvement over the messy interface of last year." He praised Siri for an improved voice, the Photos app for creating better Memories, and new social features in Apple Music, though noting the lack of people in his social circle using the service. Referencing IKEA's "IKEA Place" app, which uses augmented reality to virtually place objects in a room, he significantly praised the performance of the augmented reality technology on iPhone, writing that "It did a great job of rendering furniture in physical spaces using both the iPhone 8, and, even more impressively, it ran smoothly on my iPhone 6S". Finally, Hardawar also enjoyed new functionality on iPad, calling multitasking, the application dock and drag-and-drop "dramatic changes," and highlighting the "particularly useful" experience of dragging Internet content directly from the web into the new Files app. In summarization, he recognized the significant strides made for iPad with iOS 11, writing that "it's a shame that iOS 11 doesn't bring more to the table on the iPhone", though acknowledging the rise of augmented reality.

In November 2017, Apple's App Store support page was updated to reflect that 52% of iOS devices were running iOS 11, a slower migration rate than for the release of iOS 10 the year prior, which saw 60% user adoption by October 2016. The number increased to 59% of devices by December 2017.

=== Design inconsistencies and software bugs ===
In September 2017, Jesus Diaz of Fast Company criticized design details in iOS 11 and Apple's built-in apps not adhering to Apple's user interface guidelines. Headers not being aligned properly between different apps, elements not being centered, and different colors and sizing caused Diaz to write that "When it comes to software, Apple's attention to detail is crumbling away." However, he also looked back in history, mentioning that Apple Music's original design, a lack of optical typography alignment in the Calendar app, and previously fixed iOS design mistakes being ported to the macOS software had established that "This inconsistency and lack of attention to detail are not new at Apple." He firmly stated: "Perhaps this is inevitable, given the monumental task of having to update the operating system every year. But for a company that claims to have an obsessive attention to detail, this is not acceptable."

In November 2017, Gizmodo's Adam Clark Estes wrote extensively on software bugs and product imperfections experienced while using iOS 11. Estes pointed to issues such as keyboard covering up messages and a disappearing reply field in the Messages app, the letter "i" converting to a Unicode symbol, and the screen becoming unresponsive, writing that "The new operating system has turned my phone into a bug-infested carcass of its former self, and the frustration of trying to use it sometimes makes me want to die, too." He also wrote on the aspect of technology becoming more advanced and sophisticated, explaining that "back when the iPhone 4 came out [...] smartphones were a lot simpler. The cameras were joyfully crappy. The screens were small. The number of apps we could download and things we could connect to was paltry compared to today. [...] We should expect some bugs, I guess. More complex pieces of technology contain more points of failure, and I'm oversimplifying the issue." He concluded by theorizing on technological development, writing: "However, I am trying to understand exactly how my life with computers veered so dramatically from the days of Windows 95 when nothing worked right, to the golden age of the iPhone 4 when everything seemed perfect, to now when just a handful of iOS bugs make me feel like the world is falling apart. [...] Maybe I'm the annoying thing, the whiny one who's upset that nothing seems perfect any more. Or maybe, just maybe, Apple is slipping, and we were wrong to trust it all along."

== Problems ==
=== Wi-Fi and Bluetooth Control Center toggles ===
Shortly after iOS 11 was released, Vice's Motherboard discovered new behaviors by the Wi-Fi and Bluetooth toggles in the Control Center. When users tap to turn off the features, iOS 11 only disconnects the chips from active connections, but does not disable the respective chips in the device. The report further states that "it's a feature, not a bug", referencing documentation pages by Apple confirming the new toggle behaviors as a means to disconnect from connections but remain active for AirDrop transfers, AirPlay streaming, Apple Pencil input, handoff and other features. Security researcher Andrea Barisani told Motherboard that the new user interface was "not obvious at all", making the user experience "more uncomfortable". In October 2017, the Electronic Frontier Foundation published an article, calling the interface "misleading" and "bad for user security", due to a higher risk of security vulnerabilities with Wi-Fi and Bluetooth chips activated while not in active use. The Foundation recommended that Apple fix the "loophole in connectivity", writing that "It's simply a question of communicating better to users, and giving them control and clarity when they want their settings off - not "off-ish"".

iOS 11.2 changes this behavior slightly, by turning the toggles white and showing a warning message that explains the functions of the toggles in the Control Center, when the toggles are turned off.

=== Battery drain issues ===
Some users have experienced battery drain problems after updating to iOS 11. In a poll on its website, 70% of 9to5Mac visitors reported decreased battery life after updating to the new operating system. However, in an article featuring Twitter complaints of battery life, Daily Express wrote that "honestly, this is to be expected. It happens every year, and it's completely normal. Major iOS releases will hammer the battery on your device much faster during the first few days of use", with Forbes stating in an article that "The days after you install a new version of iOS, your iDevice is busy doing all sorts of housekeeping. Practically all of your apps have updates, so iOS is busy downloading and installing them in the background. [...] Additionally, after you install a new version of iOS, it has to do something called "re-indexing." During this process, iOS 11 will comb through all of the data on your device so that it can be cataloged for quick Spotlight searching." The article further states that "The good news is that both of these things are temporary".

Within a week of the launch of the 11.3.1 update, users began reporting continued issues with this update regarding battery drainage. Some of these reports indicated drains from 57% down to 3% in just 3 minutes. Even users with the health of the battery measuring 96% noticed iPhones draining at around 1% per minute. In addition to battery drains, some iPhone users noticed their devices having excessive heat buildup.

It has been recommended by technology experts that users not upgrade their software until the release of a version subsequent to 11.3.1 unless specifically plagued by the 'third party display issue'.

=== Calculator bug ===
In October 2017, users reported on Reddit that quickly typing in an equation in the built-in iOS Calculator app gives incorrect answers, most notably making the query "1+2+3" result in "24" rather than "6". Analysts have blamed an animation lag caused during the redesign of the app in iOS 11. The problem can be worked around by typing the numbers slowly, or by downloading alternative calculator apps from the App Store that do not have this problem. With a large amount of bug reports filed, Apple employee Chris Espinosa indicated on Twitter that the company was aware of the issue. iOS 11.2 fixed the issue.

=== Keyboard autocorrect bugs ===
In November 2017, users reported a bug in the default iOS keyboard, in which pressing "I" resulted in the system rendering the text as "!" or "A" along with an incomprehensible symbol featuring a question mark in a box. The symbol is known as Variation Selector 16 for its intended purpose of merging two characters into an emoji. Apple acknowledged the issue in a support document, advising users to set up a Text Replacement feature in their device's keyboard settings as a temporary workaround. The company confirmed to The Wall Street Journal that devices using older iOS 11 versions, as opposed to just the latest 11.1 version at the time of the publication, were affected by the issue, and an Apple spokesperson announced that "A fix will be released very soon". iOS 11.1.1 was released on November 9, 2017, fixing the issue.

At the end of the month, another keyboard autocorrection bug was reported, this time replacing the word "It" with "I.T." MacRumors suggested users set up the Text Replacement feature the same way they did for the earlier autocorrection issue, though its report notes that "some users insist this solution does not solve the problem". It was fixed with the release of iOS 11.2.

=== December 2 crashes ===
In early December, users wrote on Twitter and Reddit that, at exactly 12:15 a.m. local time on December 2, any App Store app that sends local notifications would cause the device to repeatedly restart. Reddit users reported that disabling notifications or turning off background app refresh would stop the issue, while Apple staff on Twitter reported that it was a bug in date handling, recommending users to manually set the date prior to December 2. MacRumors wrote that the issue "looks like it's limited to devices running iOS 11.1.2", with users on the 11.2 beta release not affected. iOS 11.2, released on the same day, fixed the issue.

=== iOS 11.2 HomeKit vulnerability ===
In December 2017, 9to5Mac uncovered a security vulnerability in iOS 11.2 within Apple's HomeKit smart home system, allowing unauthorized access to smart locks and garage door openers. It noted that Apple had already issued a server-side fix that, while preventing unauthorized access, also limited HomeKit functionality, with an upcoming software fix for the iOS operating system intended to restore the lost functionality. On December 13, 2017, Apple released iOS 11.2.1, which fixed the limitation on remote access.

== Supported devices ==
With the release of iOS 11, Apple dropped support for 32-bit devices, including the iPhone 5, iPhone 5c, and the fourth-generation iPad. iOS 11 requires devices with an Apple A7 or newer SoC, meaning that all devices using the older Apple A6 or A6X processors, are no longer supported. iOS 11 and above runs exclusively on devices with 64-bit processors.

=== iPhone ===
- iPhone 5s
- iPhone 6 & 6 Plus
- iPhone 6s & 6s Plus
- iPhone SE (1st generation)
- iPhone 7 & 7 Plus
- iPhone 8 & 8 Plus
- iPhone X

=== iPod Touch ===
- iPod Touch (6th generation)

=== iPad ===
- iPad Air
- iPad Air 2
- iPad (2017)
- iPad (2018)
- iPad Mini 2
- iPad Mini 3
- iPad Mini 4
- iPad Pro (9.7-inch)
- iPad Pro (10.5-inch)
- iPad Pro (12.9-inch 1st generation)
- iPad Pro (12.9-inch 2nd generation)

== Version history ==
Version	Build	Codename	Release date	Notes
11.0	15A372	Tigris	September 19, 2017	Initial release on iPhone 8 and iPhone 8 Plus Drops support for iPad (4th generation), iPhone 5 and iPhone 5c: 32-bit iOS applications are now no longer supported; Many app icons are redesigned, becoming more simple; Battery icon is redesigned; Cellular signal strength is displayed with 4 bars in ascending scale, rather than 5 dots; The Music player on Lock Screen is no longer full-screen; Screenshots can be edited via cropping, drawing, and more right after taking by tapping the small window that appears after taking a screenshot; Photos can be encoded with HEIF and HEVC to take up less space; Portrait Mode on supported devices supports HDR, True Tone flash, and optical image stabilization (OIS); The App Store has been redesigned; Introduces Do Not Disturb while Driving to automatically disable notifications when driving, silence the phone, and keep the display off, and sending an optional autoreply sent to certain contacts via iMessage when they texted.; Dock on iPad shows recently used apps; Files app is introduced which allows browsing, searching, and organizing of both on-device and iCloud Drive files; HomeKit supports sprinklers, faucets, and AirPlay 2 speakers; Augmented Reality apps on the App Store allow placing virtual objects in the real world, such as Pokémon Go; Control Center is redesigned to have all toggles on one page; Control Center can be customized depending on a user's needs; Screen recording was added, which could be enabled by adding it to the control center; Fixes multiple bugs that allowed an application to execute arbitrary code with kernel privileges; Prevents an attacker in a privileged network position from erasing a device in the process of setting up a Microsoft Exchange account; Fixes many bugs that allowed applications to execute arbitrary code with kernel privileges; Fixes multiple bugs that caused unpacking of a maliciously crafted archive to grant arbitrary code execution; Fixes a multitude of bugs that caused processing maliciously crafted XML to grant arbitrary code execution; Fixes multiple bugs where processing of maliciously crafted images led to denial-of-service; Prevents a remote attacker from executing arbitrary code; Fixes many bugs that caused processing of maliciously crafted web content to lead to arbitrary code execution; Fixes an address bar spoofing bug; Fixes a bug chain that allowed arbitrary code execution on baseband, which led to arbitrary code execution with kernel privileges in userspace
11.0.1	15A402; 15A403 (Note: iPhone 8 and iPhone 8 Plus only)	Tigris	September 26, 2017	Fixes an issue with Exchange email servers where email would fail to send
11.0.1	15A8391 (Note: iPhone X only)	Tigris	November 3, 2017	Initial release on iPhone X, preinstalled only
11.0.2 (Note: Not released for iPhone X)	15A421	Tigris	October 3, 2017	Not available for download on iPhone X: Fixes an issue on iPhone 8 and iPhone 8 Plus where a crackling sound would occur during a phone call; Fixes an issue where some photos could end up becoming hidden; Fixes an issue where some email attachments would not open
11.0.3	15A432	Tigris	October 11, 2017	Not available for download on iPhone X: Fixes an issue where haptic feedback was not working on some devices; Fixes an issue where touch was not working properly due to the displays not being replaced with genuine Apple displays
11.1	15B93; 15B101 (Note: iPad Pro (12.9-inch) (2nd generation) and iPad Pro (10.5-inch) only)	Bursa	October 31, 2017	Initial IPSW release for iPhone X: Added over 70 new emoji characters; Fixes and improvements to VoiceOver rotor; Fixes an issue where some photos could become blurry; Fixes an issue where Live Photo effects would play slowly; Fixes an issue where already cleared notifications sent from the Mail app could reappear on the Lock Screen; Fixes an issue on Apple Watch where app icons would refuse to appear in notifications
11.1.1	15B150	Bursa	November 9, 2017	Fixes an issue with keyboard auto-correct; Fixes an issue where Hey Siri would stop working
11.1.2	15B202	Bursa	November 16, 2017	Fixes an issue where a rapid drop in temperature caused problems with the touch screen of the iPhone X; Fixes an issue where distortion could be caused in Live Photos and videos captured on the iPhone X
11.2	15C114	Cinar	December 2, 2017	Added support for Apple Pay Cash (USA only); Improved wireless charging on the iPhone 8, iPhone 8 Plus and iPhone X; Added three new Live Wallpapers for the iPhone X; Fixes an issue that could cause the keyboard to appear slowly; Fixes an issue in Calculator app where rapidly typing numbers could lead to incorrect calculation results
11.2.1	15C153	Cinar	December 13, 2017	Fixes an issue where remote access could unexpectedly be disabled for shared users in the Home app
11.2.2	15C202	Cinar	January 8, 2018	Improves security of Safari and WebKit to mitigate the effects of Spectre
11.2.5	15D60	Dalaman	January 23, 2018	Adds support for HomePod; Siri can now read the News, with options for a general overview and more specific categories (US, UK, and Australia only); Fixes a bug that caused Messages conversations to appear out of order; Fixes a bug that caused the CarPlay Now Playing controls to not respond if a track change button was pressed rapidly multiple times; Fixes an issue that caused Mail notifications from Exchange accounts to vanish from iPhone X if unlocked with Face ID
11.2.6	15D100	Dalaman	February 19, 2018	Fixes a bug that caused rendering the character "జ్ఞా" to crash Messages; Fixes an issue where third-party apps failed to connect to external accessories
11.3	15E216; 15E218 (Note: iPad (6th generation) (Wi-Fi + Cellular) only)	Emet	March 29, 2018	Initial release on iPad (6th generation): Augmented Reality; Introduces ARKit 1.5, granting developers the ability to place virtual objects on vertical surfaces, such as walls or doors, in addition to horizontal surfaces; Adds the ability to detect and implement images, such as movie posters or artwork, into Augmented Reality experiences; iPhone Battery Health (Beta); Displays information about an iPhone's battery, such as its current maximum capacity and if the battery is still supporting peak performance capabilities; Indicates if the iPhone Performance Management feature is turned on, while including the option to disable the feature is desired; Gives a recommendation if the battery inside of the iPhone should be replaced; iPad Charge Management; Maintains the health of the battery when it has been connected to power for extended periods of time; Animoji; Introduces four new Animoji characters: Lion, Bear, Dragon and a Skull; Safari; Warnings are now shown when accessing unencrypted webpages; Keyboard; Introduces two new Shuangpin keyboard layouts; Improves the Japanese and Chinese keyboards on 4.7-inch and 5.5-inch devices; Users can now switch back to the keyboard from dictation mode with one tap; Adds support for using AML for Emergency SOS; Podcasts episodes can now be played with a single tap; Fixes a bug where the Lock Screen would blank itself except for the wallpaper; Fixes a bug where parents were prevented from using Face ID to approve Ask to Buy requests; Fixes a bug where audio would fail to play in cars if the app was in the background
11.3.1	15E302	Emet	April 24, 2018	Fixes an issue where on iPhone 8 devices where touch input would not register due to the displays being services with non-genuine; Fixes a bug that allowed applications to elevate privileges; Fixes two bugs where processing of maliciously crafted web content led to arbitrary code execution
11.4	15F79	Fatsa	May 29, 2018	Adds support for AirPlay 2; Adds support for pairing of HomePod Stereo; Allows storing of messages, photos, and more in iCloud; Allows teachers to assign students reading activities in iBooks via the Schoolwork app; Fixes a bug where health data failed to sync; Fixes an issue where app icons may appear in the wrong locations; Fixes a bug that caused CarPlay audio to distort; Fixes a bug where an application may be able to elevate privileges; Fixes multiple bugs where processing of maliciously crafted web content led to arbitrary code execution; Fixes many bugs where applications could gain arbitrary code execution with kernel privileges; Fixes bugs where local users could read persistent account identifiers; Fixes a bug that allowed Siri to be enabled from lock screen, and thus display notifications that would be otherwise hidden
11.4.1	15G77	Gebze	July 9, 2018	Fixes a bug that caused users to not read the last known location of AirPods in Find My iPhone; Improves reliability of Exchange account services; Fixes a bug that caused cookies to fail to delete; Fixes a bug that allowed an application to elevate privileges; Fixes multiple bugs that allowed for arbitrary code execution with kernel privileges; Fixes a bug that allowed a phone call to be forcefully initiated; Fixes multiple bugs that allowed for address bar spoofing; Fixes multiple bugs that caused processing of maliciously crafted web content to lead to arbitrary code execution; Fixes an app sandbox escape

== See also ==
- macOS High Sierra
- tvOS 11
- watchOS 4

Preceded by iOS 10	iOS 11; 2017	Succeeded by iOS 12
