= NumberSync =

- Inception: 2015
- Manufacturer: AT&T
- Website: att.com/numbersync

NumberSync is an AT&T service that allows some postpaid wireless customers to use one telephone number to send and receive calls and text messages across all of their supported devices, including smartwatches. The service, which was created by myaNUMBER and licensed to AT&T compares to Apple Continuity, is free of charge to AT&T subscribers.

== Requirements ==
As of 2015, activating NumberSync requires the following:

- An iPhone 6, 6 Plus, or newer model,
- iOS 9.2 or higher,
- iCloud and FaceTime both configured to one email address,
- An AT&T postpaid account,
- At least one of the following:
  - Another Apple iOS LTE-compatible device officially added to a Mobile Share data plan, or
  - A recent Mac running OS X El Capitan or higher.
- An Android smartphone or tablet enabled with HD Voice

== Support ==
The iPhone has supported the service since November 2015.

FirstNet subscribers on the First Net Core do not yet have NumberSync capabilities.

== See also ==
- Call forwarding
