= Notes (Apple) =

Software application for Apple platforms

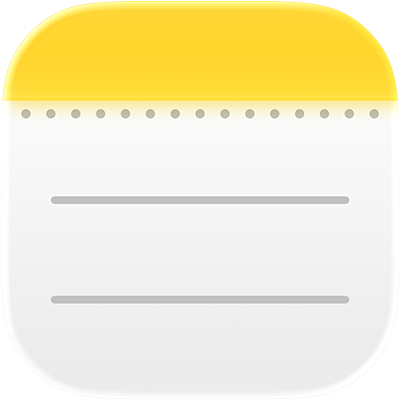

- Notes app in iOS 26
- Developer: Apple

Stable release(s)
- iOS: 1.3.3 / September 19, 2019; 7 years ago
- macOS: 4.10
- Operating system: iOS, iPadOS, visionOS, watchOS and macOS
- Type: Notetaking software
- License: Proprietary
- Website: www.icloud.com/notes

Notes is a notetaking app developed by Apple provided on the company's iOS, iPadOS, visionOS, watchOS, and macOS operating systems, the latter starting with OS X Mountain Lion.

== Usage ==
It functions as a service for making short text notes, which can be synchronized between devices using Apple's iCloud service.

== Interface ==
The application uses a similar interface on iOS and macOS, with a non-textured paper background for notes and light yellow icons, suggesting pencil or crayon.

Until 2013, both applications used a strongly skeuomorphic interface, with a lined, textured paper design; the Mountain Lion version placed this inside a leather folder. This design was replaced in OS X Mavericks and iOS 7.

== iOS/iPadOS version ==
=== iOS 7 ===
In iOS 7, as with all other default apps, Notes was redesigned, losing the notepad-like UI in the process.

=== iOS 9 ===
Starting with iOS 9, Notes received a significant functional overhaul: iCloud sync (instead of IMAP; in-line with the OS X El Capitan version), the ability to create sketches (and later, support for Apple Pencil), advanced text formatting options, several styles of lists, rich web and map link previews, support for more file type attachments, a corresponding dedicated attachment browser and a system share extension point for saving web links, images, etc.

As of iOS 9.3, individual notes can be password-protected (with the ability to use Touch ID to unlock all notes on compatible devices), however, only one password can be set for all notes locked henceforth. The password syncs across compatible devices.

=== iOS 10 ===
In iOS 10, Notes now has a collaboration feature for many people to work on a note at the same time.

=== iOS 11 ===
The update to Notes released with iOS 11 adds tables, pinned notes, a document scanner, graph and lined paper, monospaced text support, handwriting search and improved integration with Apple Pencil.

Tapping the Pencil on the Lock screen will bring up a new note, with drawing active; the Pencil can also be used while in the Notes app to start an inline drawing.

=== iOS/iPadOS 13 ===
In iOS 13, the Notes app includes a new gallery view that displays notes as thumbnails, and shared folders.

Checklist items can be automatically moved to the bottom when completed, and can be reordered using drag and drop.

Search can find text in documents scanned using Notes and can recognise images within notes.

=== iOS/iPadOS 15 ===
Notes supports using tags to categorize notes, and using mentions to notify collaborators of important changes to shared notes.

A new Activity view shows all the recent changes to a shared note.

=== iOS/iPadOS 16 ===
Quick Notes is now available on iPhone through the Share Sheet, and Smart Folders support new filters for organizing notes.

Notes can be locked using the device passcode, instead of using a specific passcode only for locked notes.

== macOS version ==
Prior to Mountain Lion, Apple Mail on macOS supported a mailbox containing notes, which was synced with notes in the Notes application in iOS. This situation was a kludge: as Apple Mail already implemented the IMAP mailbox synchronization protocol, it could also sync notes with minimal additional work.

In Mountain Lion, notes were moved to a separate Notes application. Created notes are synced through all the user's Apple devices through the iCloud service. Notes can be arranged in folders and pinned to the user's desktop.

When the application is closed, the pinned note still remains. Additionally, unlike the iPad, iPhone, and iPod touch versions, the OS X Mountain Lion Notes application allows for images to be embedded within notes.

Originally, notes could be created in three different default fonts, Noteworthy, Marker Felt, and Helvetica. Users could also add custom fonts by visiting the "Show Fonts" menu. The menu allows users to change text size, and format lists, choose the alignment (left, center, justify, or right), assign a writing direction, and indent text. Attachments, images, and hyperlinks can also be added to a note. Attachments cannot be viewed on iOS devices.

While Apple does provide a way to export individual notes as PDF files, the software does not provide a mechanism to export the text of all notes to a text file, a Rich Text File, or other commonly used data file formats as a bulk data transfer. However, advanced users can utilize AppleScript or Shortcuts to automate note exports.

=== OS X El Capitan ===
As of OS X El Capitan, Notes received a significant functional overhaul (in-line with the iOS 9 version), with major features including: iCloud sync, the ability to view sketches created on the iOS counterpart, advanced text formatting options, several styles of lists, rich web and map link previews, support for more file type attachments, a corresponding dedicated attachment browser and a system share extension point for saving web links, images, etc.

As of OS X El Capitan 4, individual notes can be password-protected, with the password syncing across compatible devices.

=== macOS High Sierra ===
The update to Notes released with macOS High Sierra adds tables.

=== macOS Catalina ===
The new Notes app in macOS Catalina lets users turn their notes into reminders.

=== macOS Sonoma ===
With macOS Sonoma, Notes now lets users create links between notes.

== In popular culture ==
Social media users have often used the Notes application to write short notes, which can then be posted as a screenshot to social media sites such as Instagram or Twitter.

Writers have noted that this form of communication has often been used by celebrities to make public statements, perhaps to give them an informal feel or extend beyond platform character limits, including often to post public apologies.

== See also ==
- Evernote – Notetaking software and online service
- Google Keep – Note-taking service developed by Google
- Microsoft OneNote – Freeform note-taking software
- Reminders (Apple) – iOS stock task management app
- Windows Notepad – Simple text editor included with Microsoft Windows
- Notebook – Book for writing, drawing, scrapbooking
