= Apple Mail =

Email client by Apple

Mail
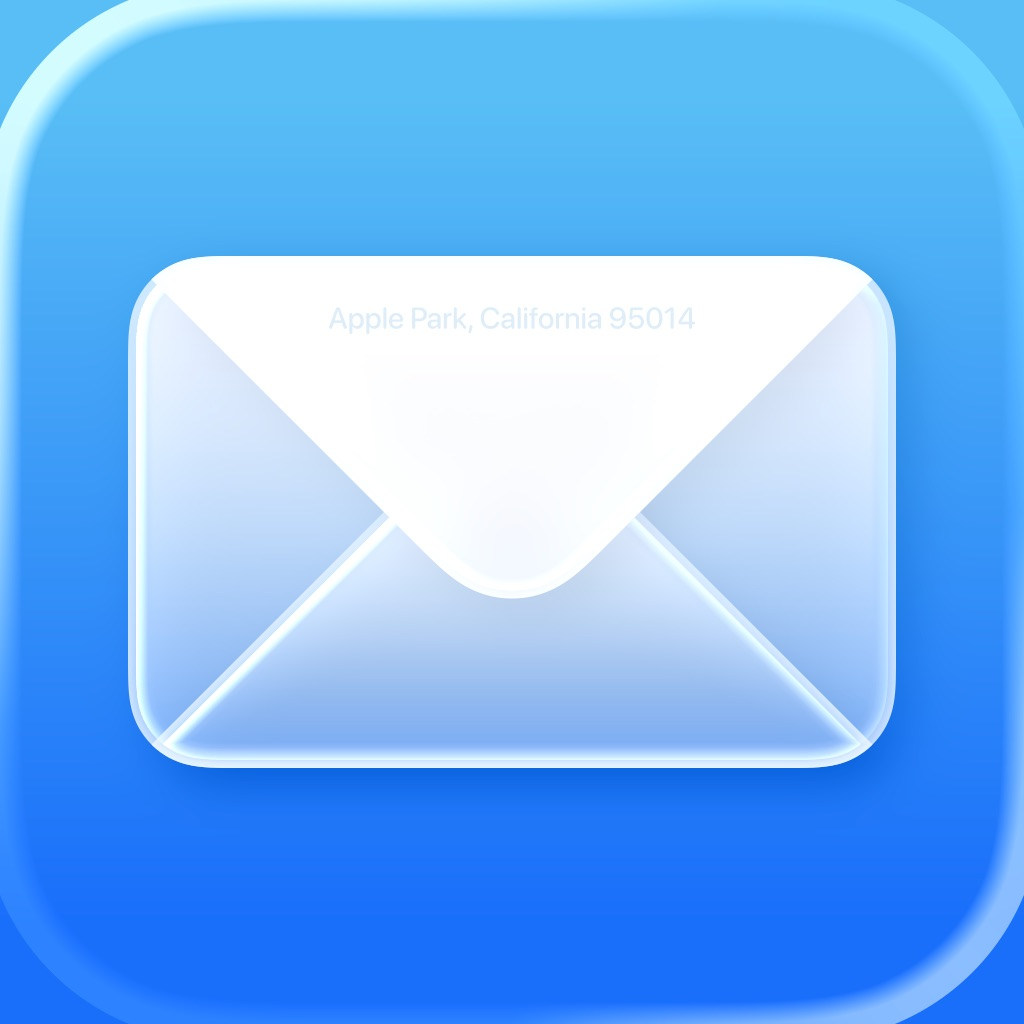
- Icon used from 2025–2026

- Apple Mail app in iOS 17
- Developer: Apple
- Engines: WebKit, Nitro
- Included with: macOS, iOS, iPadOS, watchOS, and visionOS
- Available in: 33 languages
- List of languages English, Arabic, Catalan, Croatian, Czech, Danish, Dutch, Finnish, French, German, Greek, Hebrew, Hindi, Hungarian, Indonesian, Italian, Japanese, Korean, Malay, Norwegian Bokmål, Polish, Portuguese, Romanian, Russian, Simplified Chinese, Slovak, Spanish, Swedish, Thai, Traditional Chinese, Turkish, Ukrainian, Vietnamese
- Type: Email client
- License: Proprietary software
- Website: support.apple.com/mail

Mail, also known as Apple Mail, is an email client included by Apple with its operating systems macOS, iOS, iPadOS, watchOS, and visionOS. Mail grew out of NeXTMail, which was originally developed by NeXT as part of its NeXTSTEP operating system, after Apple's acquisition of NeXT in 1997.

The current version of Mail utilizes SMTP for message sending, POP3, Exchange and IMAP for message retrieval and S/MIME for end-to-end message encryption. It is also preconfigured to work with popular email providers, such as Yahoo! Mail, AOL Mail, Gmail, Outlook and iCloud (formerly MobileMe) and it supports Exchange. iOS features a mobile version of Mail with added Exchange ActiveSync (EAS) support, though it notoriously missed the functionality of attaching files to reply emails until the release of iOS 9. EAS is not supported in the macOS version of Apple's Mail app, the main issue being that sent messages will incorrectly be duplicated in the sent messages folder, which then propagates via sync to all other devices including iOS.

Features of Mail include the ability to configure the software to receive all of a user's email accounts in the one list, ability to file emails into folders, ability to search for emails, and ability to automatically append signatures to outgoing emails. It also integrates with the Contacts list, Calendar, Maps and other apps.

== History ==
=== NeXTMail ===
Mail was originally developed by NeXT as NeXTMail, the email application for its NeXTSTEP operating system. It supported rich text formatting with images and voice messaging, and MIME emails. It also supported a text-based user interface (TUI) to allow for backwards compatibility.

When Apple began to adapt NeXTSTEP to become Mac OS X, both the operating system and the application went through various stages as it was developed. In a beta version (codenamed "Rhapsody") and various other early pre-releases of Mac OS X, Mail was known as MailViewer. However, with the third developer release of Mac OS X, the application had returned to being known simply as Mail.

=== First release ===
Mail was included in all versions of macOS up to and including Mac OS X Panther, which was released on October 24, 2003. It was integrated with other Apple applications such as Address Book, iChat, and iCal. Some of its features that remain in the most recent version of Mail include rules for mailboxes, junk mail filtering and multiple account management.

=== Mac OS X Tiger (10.4) ===
In Mac OS X Tiger (version 10.4), Mail version 2 included a proprietary single-message-per-file format (with the filename extension .emlx) to permit indexing by Spotlight. Additional features were:

- "Smart mailboxes" that used Spotlight technology to sort mail into folders.
- the ability to flag messages with a low, normal or high priority and to use these priorities in mailbox rules and smart mailboxes.
- tools for resizing photos before they are sent to avoid oversized email attachments.
- the ability to view emailed pictures as a full-screen slideshow.
- parental controls to specify who is allowed to send email to children.
- HTML message composition.

The new version also changed the UI for the buttons in the toolbar. Whereas previous buttons had free-standing defined shapes, the new buttons featured shapes within a lozenge-shaped capsule. According to many users, and even Apple's own human interface guidelines at the time, this was worse for usability. An open-source third-party application that reverted the icons to their former shapes was available. Nevertheless, Apple updated their guidelines to include capsule-shaped buttons, and the new UI persisted.

=== Mac OS X Leopard (10.5) ===
In Mac OS X Leopard (version 10.5), Mail version 3 included personalized stationery, handled in standard HTML format. In addition, it offered notes and to-dos (which could be synced with iCal) as well as a built-in RSS reader. It also introduced IMAP IDLE support for account inboxes.

=== Mac OS X Snow Leopard (10.6) ===
Mac OS X Snow Leopard (version 10.6) brought Microsoft Exchange Server 2007 support.

=== Mac OS X Lion (10.7) ===
In Mac OS X Lion (version 10.7), Mail featured a redesigned iPad-like user interface with full-screen capabilities, an updated message search interface, support for Microsoft Exchange Server 2010 and Yahoo! Mail (via IMAP). Also added was the capability to group messages by subject in a similar fashion to Mail on iOS 4. The bounce function, where unwanted emails could be bounced back to the sender, was dropped, as was support for Exchange push email.

=== OS X Mountain Lion (10.8) ===
In OS X Mountain Lion (version 10.8), Mail received VIP tagging, Safari-style inline search for words within an email message, the ability to sync with iCloud and new sharing features. Notes was split off into a stand-alone application. The RSS reader and to-dos were discontinued.

=== OS X Mavericks (10.9) ===
In OS X Mavericks (version 10.9), Mail ceased support for plain-text MIME multipart/alternative messages and solely retained the HTML or rich-text version.

=== OS X Yosemite (10.10) ===
In OS X Yosemite (version 10.10), Mail introduced Markup (inline annotation of PDF or image files) and Mail Drop (automatically uploads attachments to iCloud, and sends a link in the message instead of the whole file).

=== OS X El Capitan (10.11) ===
In OS X El Capitan (version 10.11), a filter was added to the message list to filter by various options such as Unread, Flagged, or messages with attachments. The conversation display was also redesigned and various disk space saving optimizations were implemented. Streaming notification support for Exchange accounts was also added.

=== macOS High Sierra (10.13) ===
In macOS High Sierra (version 10.13), Mail reached version 11.5, a version that was not further upgraded (in High Sierra, at least until 2021).

=== macOS Mojave (10.14) ===
In macOS Mojave (version 10.14), support for macOS's new "dark mode" was added to Mail.

=== macOS Catalina (10.15) ===
In macOS Catalina (version 10.15), Mail added support for Block Sender, Unsubscribe, Mute Thread and layout options.

=== macOS Big Sur (11.0) ===
In macOS Big Sur, Mail was updated alongside the other first-party apps to feature the new design language of Big Sur, with a full-height sidebar and updated icons that match the blue color of the app's icon. The Mail app icon was changed to be more consistent with the iOS version, depicting a white envelope on a blue background, albeit with a more "3D" look that has the text "Apple Park California 95014" subtly etched on the envelope. Mail now also supports interactive notifications and integrates with the Reminders app to let Siri suggest possible reminders based on who you are emailing.

=== macOS Monterey (12.0) - Mail Version 15.0 ===
In macOS Monterey, Mail now has an option to block trackers in emails from viewing a user's IP address and being notified of whether they have read an email. Extensions from the Mac App Store can now integrate with the Mail app, and iCloud+ subscribers can easily create a new email address that forwards to their primary address.

=== macOS Ventura (13.0) - Mail Version 16.0 ===
In macOS Ventura, Mail updated to include features from popular competitors, such as allowing a user to undo sending an email for up to 10, 20, or 30 seconds, scheduling an email to be sent at a user-set time, reminding the user to follow up on an email, and notifying the user to add an attachment or recipient if they seemed to forget to do themselves. Search has been improved by using synonyms for search terms and automatically correcting typos. It also shows shared content and previous search terms when invoked. Messages you sent which haven't received a reply will also move to the top of the inbox to send a follow-up. Emails from companies now show their logo using BIMI support.

=== macOS Sonoma (14.0) - Mail Version 16.0 ===
In macOS Sonoma, Mail is still using version 16.0 but with an updated build number.

=== macOS Sequoia (15.0) - Mail Version 16.0 ===
In macOS Sequoia, Mail is still using version 16.0 but with an updated build number. Mail version 16.0 with build 3826.700.81.1.8 runs on Sequoia 15.7.9.

=== macOS Tahoe (26.0) - Mail Version 16.0 ===
In macOS Tahoe, Mail is still using version 16.0 but with an updated build number.

=== macOS Golden Gate (27.0) - Mail Version 16.0 ===
In macOS Golden Gate, Mail is still using version 16.0 but with an updated build number.

== See also ==
- GNUMail
- Comparison of email clients
- Comparison of feed aggregators
