= Unique Device Identifier =

Unique Device Identifier may refer to:

- UDID, plural: UDIDs, a feature of Apple's devices running iOS, tvOS, watchOS, and macOS
- Unique Device Identifier (UDI), plural: UDIs, a unique identifier assigned to a medical device through the Unique Device Identification (UDI) System, within the United States, Europe, China, South Korea, Saudi Arabia and Taiwan.
