= OS X El Capitan =

2015 operating system version

- Version of the macOS operating system

- OS X El Capitan desktop
- Developer: Apple
- OS family: Macintosh; Unix
- Working state: No longer supported
- Source model: Proprietary, with open source components
- General availability: September 30, 2015; 11 years ago
- Latest release: 10.11.6 (15G22010) / July 9, 2018; 8 years ago
- Update method: Mac App Store
- Supported platforms: x86-64
- Kernel type: Hybrid (XNU)
- License: APSL and Apple EULA
- Preceded by: OS X Yosemite
- Succeeded by: macOS Sierra
- Official website: OS X El Capitan (archived at Wayback Machine)
- Tagline: There's more to love with every click.

Support status
- Obsolete, unsupported as of October 2018. iTunes is no longer being updated, but is able to download driver updates to sync to newer devices.

OS X El Capitan (/ɛl ˌkæpɪˈtɑːn/ el KAP-i-TAHN) (version 10.11), also known as macOS El Capitan, is the twelfth major release of macOS, Apple's desktop and server operating system for Macintosh. It focuses mainly on performance, stability, and security. Following the California location-based naming scheme introduced with OS X Mavericks, it was named after the rock formation El Capitan in Yosemite National Park. OS X El Capitan is the final version to be released under the name OS X. OS X El Capitan received far better reviews than Yosemite.

The first beta of OS X El Capitan was released to developers shortly following the WWDC keynote on June 8, 2015. The first public beta was made available on July 9, 2015. There were multiple betas released after the keynote. OS X El Capitan was released to end users on September 30, 2015, as a free upgrade through the Mac App Store.

OS X El Capitan is the final version of OS X to support the 2008-2009 aluminum MacBook and Xserve, as its successor macOS Sierra is incompatible with that model of the MacBook and the final 2009 model of the Xserve.

== System requirements ==
All Macs supporting OS X Mountain Lion, OS X Mavericks, and OS X Yosemite support OS X El Capitan, although not all of its features will work on older models. For example, Apple notes that the newly available Metal API is available on "all Macs since 2012".

These computers can run OS X El Capitan, provided they have at least 2 GB of RAM, with exceptions:

- iMac (Mid 2007 or newer)
- MacBook (Aluminum, Late 2008 or newer)
- MacBook Air (Late 2008 or newer)
- MacBook Pro (Mid 2007 or newer)
- Mac Mini (Early 2009 or newer)
- Mac Pro (Early 2008 or newer)
- Xserve (Early 2009)

Of these computers, the following models were equipped with 1 GB RAM as the standard option on the base model when they were shipped originally. They can only run OS X El Capitan if they have at least 2 GB of RAM.

- iMac (Mid 2007 – Early 2008)
- Mac Mini (Early 2009)

The following computers support features such as Handoff, Instant Hotspot, AirDrop between Mac computers and iOS devices, as well as the new Metal API:

- iMac (Late 2012 or later)
- MacBook (Early 2015 or newer)
- MacBook Air (Mid 2012 or newer)
- MacBook Pro (Mid 2012 or newer)
- Mac Mini (Late 2012 or newer)
- Mac Pro (Late 2013)

The upgrade varies in size depending upon which Apple Mac computer it is being installed on; in most scenarios, it will require about 6 GB of disk space.

== Features ==
OS X El Capitan includes features to improve the security, performance, design and usability of OS X. Compared to OS X Yosemite, Apple says that opening PDFs is four times faster, app switching and viewing messages in Mail is twice as fast and launching apps is 40% faster. The maximum amount of memory that could be allocated to the graphics processor has been increased from 1024 MB to 1536 MB on Macs with an Intel HD 4000 GPU. OS X El Capitan supports Metal, Apple's graphics API introduced in iOS 8 to speed up performance in games and professional applications. Apple's typeface San Francisco replaces Helvetica Neue as the system typeface. OS X El Capitan also adopts LibreSSL as a replacement for OpenSSL used in older versions.

=== Window management ===
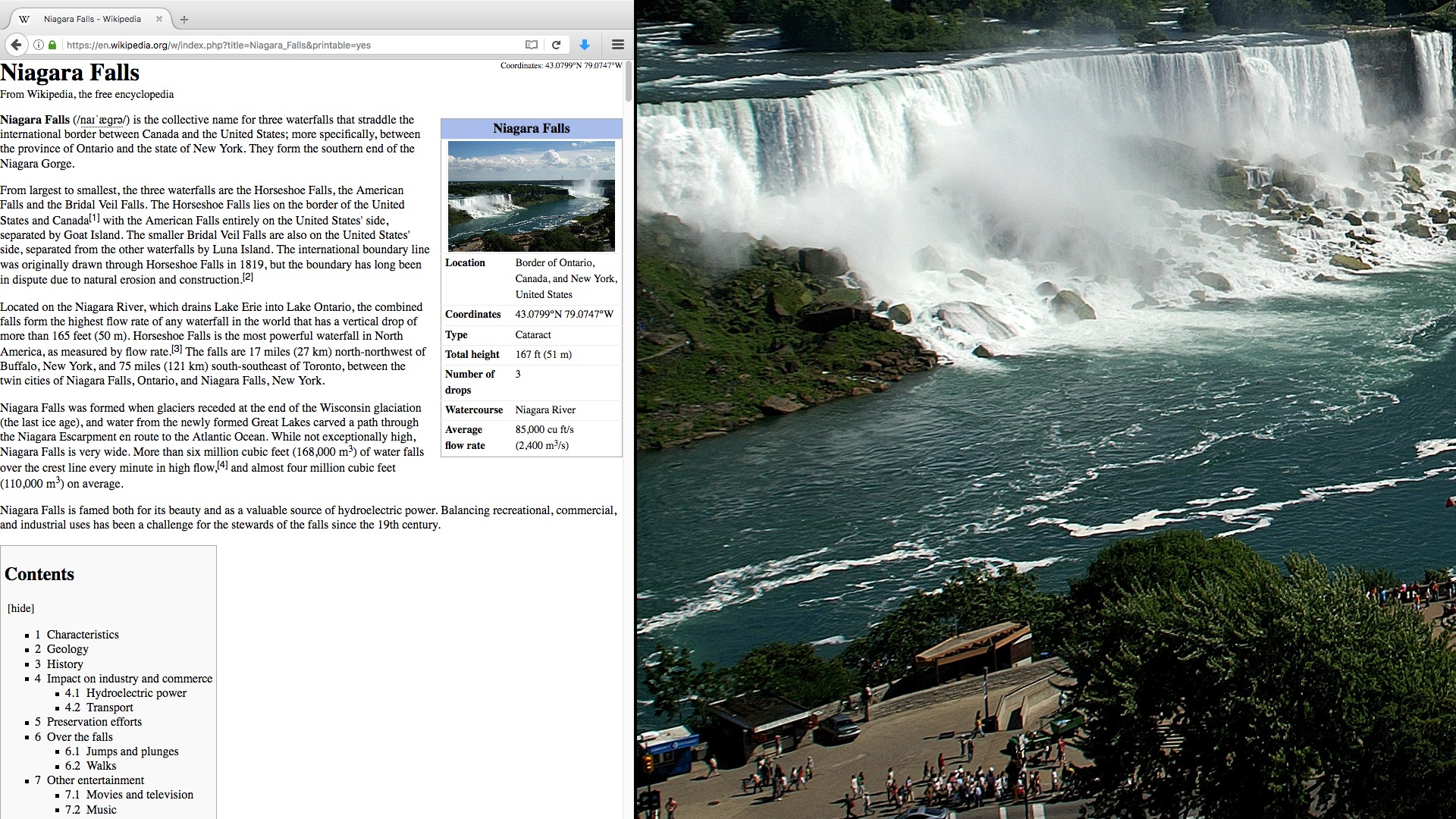
An example of the split screen view in OS X El Capitan

OS X El Capitan introduces new window management features such as creating a full-screen split screen limited to two app windows side by side in full screen by pressing the green button on left upper corner of the window or Control+⌘ Cmd+F keyboard shortcut, then snapping any supported other window to that full screen application. This feature is slightly similar to, although less extensive than, the snap-assist feature in Windows 7 (and later) and several Linux desktop environments, such as GNOME. OS X El Capitan improves Mission Control to incorporate this feature across multiple spaces. It also enables users to spot the pointer more easily by enlarging it by shaking the mouse or swiping a finger back and forth on the trackpad.

=== Applications ===
==== Messages and Mail ====
OS X El Capitan adds multi-touch gestures to applications like Mail and Messages that allow a user to delete or mark emails or conversations by swiping a finger on a multi-touch device, such as a trackpad. OS X also analyzes the contents of individual emails in Mail and uses the gathered information in other applications, such as Calendar. For example, an invitation in Mail can automatically be added as a Calendar event.

==== Maps ====
Apple Maps in El Capitan shows public transit information similar to Maps in iOS 9. This feature was limited to a handful of cities upon launch: Baltimore, Berlin, Chicago, London, Los Angeles, Mexico City, New York City, Paris, Philadelphia, San Francisco, Shanghai, Toronto and Washington D.C.

==== Notes ====
The Notes application receives an overhaul, similar to Notes in iOS 9. Both applications have more powerful text-processing capabilities, such as to-do lists (like in the Reminders application), inline webpage previews, photos and videos, digital sketches, map locations and other documents and media types. Notes replaces traditional IMAP-based syncing with iCloud, which offers better end-to-end encryption and faster syncing.

==== Safari ====
Safari in El Capitan lets users pin tabs for frequently accessed websites to the tab bar, similar to Firefox and Google Chrome. Users are able to quickly identify and mute tabs that play audio without having to search for individual tabs. Safari supports AirPlay video streaming to an Apple TV without the need to broadcast the entire webpage. Safari extensions are now hosted and signed by Apple as part of the updated Apple Developer program and they received native support for content blocking, allowing developers to block website components (such as advertisements) without JavaScript injection. The app also allows the user to customize the font and background of the Reader mode.

==== Spotlight ====
Spotlight is improved with more contextual information such as the weather, stocks, news and sports scores. It is also able to process queries in natural language. For example, users can type "Show me pictures that I took in Yosemite National Park in July 2014" and Spotlight will use that request to bring up the corresponding info. The app can now be resized and moved across the screen.

==== Photos ====
Photos introduced editing extensions, which allow Photos to use editing tools from other apps.

=== System Integrity Protection ===
OS X El Capitan has a new security feature called System Integrity Protection (SIP, sometimes referred to as "rootless") that protects certain system processes, files and folders from being modified or tampered with by other processes even when executed by the root user or by a user with root privileges (sudo). Apple says that the root user can be a significant risk factor to the system's security, especially on systems with a single user account on which that user is also the administrator. System Integrity Protection is enabled by default, but can be disabled.

== Reception ==
Upon release, OS X El Capitan was met with positive reception from both users and critics, with praise mostly going towards the overall functionality of the new features and improved stability. Dieter Bohn of The Verge awarded the operating system a score of 8.5 out of 10; while Jason Snell of Macworld was also positive, rating it 4.5 out of 5. Edward Mendelson from PC Mag gave it a 4.5 out of 5. Many people criticized Apple's native apps for not having improved beyond third-party applications. In summary, OS X El Capitan had good reception with some criticisms.

=== Issues ===
After the 10.11.4 update, many users started reporting that their MacBooks were freezing, requiring a hard reboot. This issue mostly affects Early 2015 MacBook Pro computers, although many others have reported freezes in other models. Several users created videos on YouTube which showed the freezes. Soon after this, Apple released the 10.11.5 update, which contained stability improvements. Apple later acknowledged these problems, recommending their users to update to the last point release.

After the December 13, 2016, release of Security Update 2016–003, users reported problems with the WindowServer process becoming unresponsive, causing the GUI to freeze and sometimes necessitating a hard reboot to fix. In response, on January 17, 2017, Apple released Security Update 2016-003 Supplemental (10.11.6) to fix "a kernel issue that may cause your Mac to occasionally become unresponsive" and at the same time released an updated version of Security Update 2016-003 which includes the fix released in the supplemental. Users who have not previously installed Security Update 2016-003 are advised to install the updated version to reach build 15G1217, while users who have already installed the December 13, 2016 Security Update 2016-003 only need to install the supplemental update.

== Release history ==
Version	Build	Date	Darwin version	Release notes	Standalone download
10.11	15A284	September 30, 2015	15.0.0	Original Mac App Store release	—N/a
10.11.1	15B42	October 21, 2015	15.0.0	About the OS X El Capitan v10.11.1 Update	OS X El Capitan 10.11.1 Update
10.11.2	15C50	December 8, 2015	15.2.0	About the OS X El Capitan v10.11.2 Update	OS X El Capitan 10.11.2 Update; OS X El Capitan 10.11.2 Combo Update
10.11.3	15D21	January 19, 2016	15.3.0	About the OS X El Capitan v10.11.3 Update	OS X El Capitan 10.11.3 Update; OS X El Capitan 10.11.3 Combo Update
10.11.4	15E65	March 21, 2016	15.4.0	About the OS X El Capitan v10.11.4 Update	OS X El Capitan 10.11.4 Update; OS X El Capitan 10.11.4 Combo Update
10.11.5	15F34	May 16, 2016	15.5.0	About the OS X El Capitan v10.11.5 Update	OS X El Capitan 10.11.5 Update; OS X El Capitan 10.11.5 Combo Update
10.11.6	15G31	July 18, 2016	15.6.0	About the OS X El Capitan v10.11.6 Update	OS X El Capitan 10.11.6 Update; OS X El Capitan 10.11.6 Combo Update
10.11.6	15G1004	September 1, 2016	15.6.0	About the security content of Security Update 2016-001 El Capitan	Security Update 2016-001 El Capitan
10.11.6	15G1011		15.6.0		
10.11.6	15G1108	October 24, 2016	15.6.0	About the security content of Security Update 2016-002 El Capitan	Security Update 2016-002 El Capitan
10.11.6	15G1212	December 13, 2016	15.6.0	About the security content of Security Update 2016-003 El Capitan	Security Update 2016-003 El Capitan
10.11.6	15G1217	January 17, 2017	15.6.0	About the security content of Security Update 2016-003 El Capitan	Security Update 2016-003 El Capitan; Security Update 2016-003 Supplemental (10.11.6)
10.11.6	15G1421	March 27, 2017	15.6.0	About the security content of Security Update 2017-001 El Capitan	Security Update 2017-001 El Capitan
10.11.6	15G1510	May 15, 2017	15.6.0	About the security content of Security Update 2017-002 El Capitan	Security Update 2017-002 El Capitan
10.11.6	15G1611	July 19, 2017	15.6.0	About the security content of Security Update 2017-003 El Capitan	Security Update 2017-003 El Capitan
10.11.6	15G17023	October 31, 2017	15.6.0	About the security content of Security Update 2017-004 El Capitan	Security Update 2017-004 El Capitan
10.11.6	15G18013	December 6, 2017	15.6.0	About the security content of Security Update 2017-005 El Capitan	Security Update 2017-005 El Capitan
10.11.6	15G19009	January 23, 2018	15.6.0	About the security content of Security Update 2018-001 El Capitan	Security Update 2018-001 El Capitan
10.11.6	15G20015	March 29, 2018	15.6.0	About the security content of Security Update 2018-002 El Capitan	Security Update 2018-002 El Capitan
10.11.6	15G21013	June 1, 2018	15.6.0	About the security content of Security Update 2018-003 El Capitan	Security Update 2018-003 El Capitan
10.11.6	15G22010	July 9, 2018	15.6.0	About the security content of Security Update 2018-004 El Capitan	Security Update 2018-004 El Capitan

== Timeline of Mac operating systems ==
Timeline of Mac operating systems

Preceded by OS X 10.10 (Yosemite)	OS X 10.11 (El Capitan); 09/2015	Succeeded by macOS 10.12 (Sierra)
