= UDID =

Device identifier used on Apple Inc. hardware

UDID is an acronym for Unique Device Identifier. The UDID is a feature of Apple's devices running iOS, tvOS, watchOS, and macOS. It is a unique identifier that is calculated from different hardware values, such as the ECID. It is sent to Apple servers when a user tries to activate the device during Setup. This ID is also used to detect the phone or to communicate with it while restoring the IPSW firmware.

== Formats ==
This unique ID has been formatted in two ways: for devices introduced between 2007 and 2018 it was represented as a 40-digit lowercase hex code, and for device models introduced after 2018, as a 25-digit uppercase hex code. It is not written on the device cover as the IMEI is, but it can be retrieved by iTunes in normal mode.

== Usage ==
Apple mostly uses this ID to identify the device on their services, such as Apple ID and iCloud. This also holds the Find My Activation Lock status.

Starting from iOS 11, Apple's verification server will check the device's UDID before it could be set up. If the device's UDID is malformed or not present in Apple's database, the device cannot be activated and will be denied access to the verification server. If said device is connected to iTunes, an error message will appear stating that the iPhone could not be activated because "the activation information could not be obtained from the device."

== Calculation of 2007 format ==
The UDID is calculated as follows for the Verizon iPhone 4:

UDID = SHA1(serial + ECID + wifiMac + bluetoothMac)

All other devices use:

UDID = SHA1(serial + IMEI + wifiMac + bluetoothMac)

== See also ==
- Identifier
- IMEI
- Product code
