= OS X Yosemite =

2014 operating system version

- Version of the macOS operating system
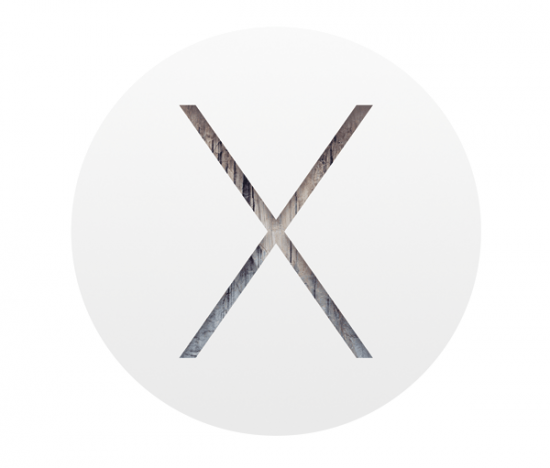

- The default desktop of OS X Yosemite
- Developer: Apple
- OS family: Macintosh; Unix
- Working state: No longer supported
- Source model: Closed, with open source components
- General availability: October 16, 2014; 12 years ago
- Latest release: 10.10.5 (Build 14F2511) / July 19, 2017; 9 years ago
- Update method: Mac App Store
- Supported platforms: x86-64
- Kernel type: Hybrid (XNU)
- License: APSL and Apple EULA
- Preceded by: OS X Mavericks
- Succeeded by: OS X El Capitan
- Official website: OS X Yosemite (archived at Wayback Machine)
- Tagline: Every bit as powerful as it looks.

Support status
- Obsolete, unsupported as of August 2017. iTunes is no longer being updated, but is able to download driver updates to sync to newer devices.

OS X Yosemite (/joʊˈsɛmɪti/ yoh-SEM-it-ee; version 10.10) is the eleventh major release of macOS, Apple's desktop and server operating system for Macintosh computers.

OS X Yosemite was announced and released to developers on June 2, 2014, at WWDC 2014 and released to public beta testers on July 24, 2014. Yosemite was released to consumers on October 16, 2014. Following the Northern California landmark-based naming scheme introduced with OS X Mavericks, it is named after the Yosemite National Park.

== System requirements ==
All Macintosh computers capable of running OS X Mountain Lion (v10.8.x) are able to run Yosemite as the two operating systems have the same requirements. However, to take full advantage of the Handoff feature, additional minimum system requirements include a Mac with Bluetooth LE (Bluetooth 4.0). As with Mavericks and Mountain Lion, 2 GB of RAM, 8 GB of available storage, and Mac OS X Snow Leopard 10.6.8 or later are required.

These are the models that are compatible with OS X Yosemite:

- iMac (Mid 2007 to Mid 2015)
- MacBook (Late 2008 to Mid 2010)
- 12-inch MacBook (2015)
- MacBook Air (Late 2008 to Early 2015)
- MacBook Pro (Mid 2007 to Mid 2015)
- Mac Mini (Early 2009 to Late 2014)
- Mac Pro (Early 2008 to Late 2013)
- Xserve (Early 2009)

These are the models that support new features such as Handoff, Instant Hotspot as well as AirDrop between Mac computers and iOS devices:

- iMac (Late 2012 or later)
- MacBook (Early 2015 or later)
- MacBook Air (Mid 2012 or later)
- MacBook Pro (Mid 2012 or later)
- Mac Mini (Late 2012 or later)
- Mac Pro (Late 2013)

== Features ==
=== Default wallpaper ===
The default desktop picture is an image of Half Dome.

=== Design ===
Yosemite introduced a major overhaul of OS X's user interface, emphasizing flat graphic design over skeuomorphism, following the aesthetic introduced with iOS 7 and certain applications from OS X Mavericks. It was the first major redesign of the OS X user interface since 10.5 Leopard. Other changes include thinner fonts and blurred translucency effects. Some icons have been changed to correspond with those of iOS 7 and iOS 8. Yosemite maintains the OS X desktop metaphor.

Other design changes include new icons, light and dark color schemes, and the replacement of Lucida Grande with Helvetica Neue as the default system typeface. Yosemite is the only macOS version to use Helvetica Neue as the default typeface, as in El Capitan it was again changed, this time to Apple's own, newly-designed San Francisco typeface. In Yosemite, the Dock is a 2D translucent rectangular strip instead of a skeuomorphic glass shelf, reminiscent of the Dock design used in early versions of Mac OS X through Tiger and in iOS since iOS 7.

=== Continuity ===
Many of Yosemite's new features focus on the theme of "continuity", increasing its integration with other Apple platforms and services such as iOS and iCloud. The Handoff functionality allows the operating system to integrate with iOS 8 devices over Bluetooth LE and Wi-Fi; users can place and answer phone calls using their iPhone as a conduit, send and receive text messages, activate personal hotspots, or load items being worked on in a mobile app (such as Mail drafts or Numbers spreadsheets) directly into their desktop equivalent.

=== Notification Center ===
Notification Center features a new "Today" view, similar to that in iOS. The Today view can display information and updates from various sources, along with widgets. The widgets in the Today view are similar to those of iOS 8.

=== Photos ===
As of OS X 10.10.3, Photos replaces both iPhoto and Aperture. It uses iCloud Photo Library to upload all the user's photos across their devices.

=== Other ===
Spotlight is a more prominent part of the operating system; it now displays its search box in the center of the screen and can include results from online sources, including Bing, Maps, and Wikipedia. Stock applications such as Safari and Mail have been updated. In particular, many security features have been added to Safari, such as a custom history clearing option that lets users clear history, cookies, and other data from the previous hour, day, or two days. In addition, Apple added DuckDuckGo to its search offerings, a non-tracking search engine that doesn't store users' data. Safari allows you to remotely close tabs from an iOS device. Safari now supports browsing in private browsing mode with certain windows (as opposed to all the windows having to be either in or out of private browsing).

The green "zoom" button on windows now has a different function in applications that support full-screen mode. Instead of simply enlarging the window, the button now enters full-screen mode, eliminating the full-screen button at the top-right corner of windows that has been present since Mac OS X Lion. However, holding the Option key (⌥) while clicking the zoom button or double-clicking on the window chrome continues to invoke the original behavior.

JavaScript for Automation (JXA) is the new system-wide support for scripting with JavaScript, built upon JavaScriptCore and the Open Scripting Architecture. It features an Objective-C bridge which enables entire Cocoa applications to be programmed in JavaScript.

Along with other framework changes, CloudKit was integrated in this release. CloudKit functions as a Mobile Backend as a Service (MBaaS) and is one method for app developers to integrate access to Apple's iCloud servers into their apps.

There is a "dark mode" in System Preferences which makes the Dock and menu bar darker.

== Beta testing ==
Apple initiated a new public beta program for OS X, a practice not seen with its operating systems since the 2000s US$29.95 Mac OS X Public Beta, which had preceded the release of Mac OS X v10.0. Yosemite is part of the OS X Beta Seed Program, a public program that allows the first 1 million users to download and test the Yosemite beta at no charge. Beta testers are required to acknowledge the potential risks involved with prerelease software, and sign a non-disclosure agreement (NDA). The program began releasing Public Betas on July 24, 2014. Six public betas of Yosemite were released.

== Reception ==
On release, Yosemite received positive reviews, with users praising the simplified user interface. Programmer John Siracusa, who had reviewed every OS release, wrote for Ars Technica that "Yosemite is an aesthetic one-way valve... switching back to Mavericks after a week or two in Yosemite is like returning to iOS 6. Everything looks embarrassingly chunky, glossy, and gaudy." Macworld's review generally praised Yosemite for its design, but noted that it had found WiFi network issues and that Continuity had proved unreliable.

Yosemite faced problems with network stability and the discoveryd DNS program. Because of this, Apple replaced discoveryd with the mDNSResponder system (used in Mavericks) in 10.10.4. Another notable bug experienced on Yosemite was the 'Unicode of death' problem, following a similar bug in 2013, in which a meaningless Arabic text string could crash applications using the system text-display APIs. Some users who upgraded to Yosemite complained that the Finder fails to show the contents of folders.

Spotlight on Yosemite by default reports the user's current location (at the city level) and all their search queries to Apple and third parties. Reporting by Spotlight can be disabled by the user, although, even if this is done, the Safari web browser will continue to send search terms to Apple unless the function is separately disabled.

== Release history ==
Version	Build	Date	Darwin version	Release notes
10.10	14A389	October 16, 2014	14.0	Original Mac App Store release
10.10.1	14B25	November 17, 2014	14.0	
10.10.2	14C109	January 27, 2015	14.1	
10.10.2	14C1510	March 9, 2015	14.1	
10.10.2	14C2043	March 9, 2015	14.1	Forked build for the Early 2015 MacBook Air
10.10.2	14C1514	March 19, 2015	14.1	
10.10.2	14C2513	March 19, 2015	14.1	
10.10.3	14D131	April 8, 2015	14.3	
10.10.3	14D136	April 16, 2015	14.3	Supplemental Update; Fixes issue with video driver issue that may prevent the Mac from starting up when running certain apps that capture video
10.10.4	14E46	June 30, 2015	14.4	
10.10.5	14F27	August 13, 2015	14.5	
10.10.5	14F1021	October 21, 2015	14.5	
10.10.5	14F1505	November 12, 2015	14.5	
10.10.5	14F1509	December 11, 2015	14.5	
10.10.5	14F1605	January 19, 2016	14.5	
10.10.5	14F1713	March 21, 2016	14.5	
10.10.5	14F1808	May 18, 2016	14.5	
10.10.5	14F1909	July 18, 2016	14.5	
10.10.5	14F1912	September 1, 2016	14.5	
10.10.5	14F2009	October 24, 2016	14.5	
10.10.5	14F2109	December 13, 2016	14.5	
10.10.5	14F2315	March 27, 2017	14.5	
10.10.5	14F2411	May 15, 2017	14.5	
10.10.5	14F2511	July 19, 2017	14.5	

== Timeline of Mac operating systems ==
Timeline of Mac operating systems

Preceded by OS X 10.9 (Mavericks)	OS X 10.10 (Yosemite); 2014	Succeeded by OS X 10.11 (El Capitan)
