= Reminders (Apple) =

iOS stock task management app

- Overview in the Reminders app in iOS 26
- Developer: Apple
- Release: iOS: October 12, 2011; 15 years ago; macOS: July 12, 2012; 14 years ago; watchOS: September 13, 2016; 10 years ago
- Operating system: iOS 5 or later; iPadOS; OS X Mountain Lion or later; watchOS 3 or later; visionOS or later
- Type: Task management
- License: Proprietary
- Website: www.icloud.com/reminders

Reminders is a task management program developed by Apple for their iOS, macOS, watchOS, iPadOS and visionOS platforms that allows users to create lists and set notifications for themselves. The app was introduced in iOS 5 and OS X 10.8 "Mountain Lion" and was rebuilt from the ground up with the release of iOS 13.

== Features ==
Reminders are placed into four categories which can be found at the top of the screen; "Today", "Scheduled", "All", and "Flagged". Users can also create their own lists of reminders. New reminders can be placed into lists or set as subtasks and can include several details including: a priority tag, a note about the reminder, and an image or URL attachment.

Tasks appear in the Notification Center 24 hours before the time a reminder is set for. Additionally, alarms can be set for reminders, sending a notification to users at a certain time and date, when a geofence around an area is crossed, or when a message starts being typed to a set contact. If a time-based alert is set, it can repeat every day, week, two weeks, month, or year.

Reminders can be marked as completed (checked) and are automatically hidden. Lists can be synced between iOS, macOS, watchOS, iPadOS and visionOS through iCloud as well as shared with other contacts. Once shared, tasks can be added or completed by anyone with access to a list and specific reminders can be assigned to different people.
