= OS X Mavericks =

2013 operating system version

- Version of the macOS operating system

- The default interface of OS X Mavericks
- Developer: Apple
- OS family: Macintosh; Unix
- Working state: No longer supported
- Source model: Closed, with open source components
- General availability: October 22, 2013; 13 years ago
- Latest release: 10.9.5 (Build 13F1911) / July 18, 2016; 10 years ago
- Update method: Mac App Store
- Supported platforms: x86-64
- Kernel type: Hybrid (XNU)
- License: APSL, BSD, GPL v2, and Apple EULA
- Preceded by: OS X Mountain Lion
- Succeeded by: OS X Yosemite
- Official website: OS X Mavericks (archived at Wayback Machine)
- Tagline: Power to the desktop.

Support status
- Obsolete, unsupported as of September 2016. iTunes is no longer being updated after March 2017, but does have partial support for newer devices.

OS X Mavericks (version 10.9) is the tenth major release of macOS, Apple's desktop and server operating system for Macintosh computers. OS X Mavericks was announced on June 10, 2013, at WWDC 2013, and was released on October 22, 2013, worldwide. It was also the last version to use a mostly skeuomorphic design; the next release, OS X Yosemite, featured a redesign of the user interface appearance. It was distributed through the Mac App Store just like OS X Lion and Mountain Lion.

The update emphasized battery life, Finder improvements, other improvements for power users, and increased iCloud integration, as well as bringing more of Apple's iOS apps to OS X. Mavericks was named after the surfing location in Northern California. It also removed some of the skeuomorphic designs from OS X Mountain Lion, and it is the final version of macOS that features the Lucida Grande typeface as the standard system font since Mac OS X Public Beta in 2000.

Mavericks was the first OS X release to be named after a location in California, and the first to be a free upgrade since Mac OS X 10.1.

== History ==
Apple announced OS X Mavericks on June 10, 2013, during the company's Apple Worldwide Developers Conference (WWDC) keynote (which also introduced iOS 7, a revised MacBook Air, the sixth-generation AirPort Extreme, the fifth-generation AirPort Time Capsule, and a redesigned Mac Pro). During a keynote on October 22, 2013, Apple announced that the official release of 10.9 on the Mac App Store would be available immediately, and that unlike previous versions of OS X, 10.9 would be available at no charge to all users running Snow Leopard (10.6.8) or later.

On October 22, 2013, Apple offered free upgrades for life on OS X and iWork.

== System requirements ==
All the Macs supporting OS X Mountain Lion support OS X Mavericks. As with Mountain Lion, 2 GB of RAM, 8 GB of available storage, and Mac OS X Snow Leopard or later are required. Mavericks and later versions are all available for free.

The full list of compatible models:

- iMac (Mid 2007 or later)
- MacBook (Aluminum, Late 2008 or later)
- MacBook Air (Late 2008 or later)
- MacBook Pro (Mid 2007 or later)
- Mac Mini (Early 2009 or later)
- Mac Pro (Early 2008 or later)
- Xserve (Early 2009)

== System features ==
The menu bar and the Dock are available on each display. Additionally, AirPlay compatible displays such as the Apple TV can be used as an external display. Mission Control has been updated to organize and switch between Desktop workspaces independently between multiple displays.

OS X Mavericks introduced App Nap, which sleeps apps that are not currently visible. Any app running on Mavericks can be eligible for this feature by default.

Compressed Memory is a virtual memory compression system which automatically compresses data from inactive apps when approaching maximum memory capacity.

Timer coalescing is a feature that enhances energy efficiency by reducing CPU usage by up to 72 percent. This allows MacBooks to run for longer periods of time and desktop Macs to run cooler.

Apple now supports OpenGL 4.1 Core Profile and OpenCL 1.2. Server Message Block version 2 (SMB2) is now the default protocol for sharing files, rather than AFP. This is to increase performance and cross-platform compatibility.

Some skeuomorphs, such as the leather texture in Calendar, the legal pad theme of Notes, and the book-like appearance of Contacts, have been removed from the UI and replaced with flat design similar to iOS 7.

iCloud Keychain stores a user's usernames, passwords and Wi-Fi passwords to allow the user to fill this information into forms when needed.

The system has native LinkedIn sharing integration.

IPoTB (Internet Protocol over Thunderbolt Bridge) Thunderbolt networking is supported in Mavericks. This feature allows the user to quickly transfer a large amount of data between two Macs.

Notification Center allows the user to reply to notifications instantly, allows websites to send notifications, and, when the user wakes up a Mac that was in a sleep state, displays a summary of missed notifications before the machine is unlocked. Some system alerts, such as low battery, removal of drives without ejecting, and a failed Time Machine backup have been moved to Notification Center.

The "traffic light" close, minimize, and maximize window buttons have appeared somewhat brighter than OS X Lion and OS X Mountain Lion.

== App features ==
Finder gets enhancements such as Safari-styled tabs and fullscreen support. File labels, introduced in Mac OS X Panther, have been replaced with tags, of which a file can have multiple applied at a time and which appear as a series of colored dots next to the filename rather than a rounded highlight covering the entire text label. Pinch-to-zoom and swipe-to-navigate-history gestures have been removed, although both are supported everywhere else.

The new iBooks application allows the user to read books purchased through the iBooks Store. The app also allows the user to purchase new content from the iBooks Store, and provides a night mode to make it easier to read in dark environments.

The new Maps application adds the same functionalities that were featured in iOS Maps. Among these new features is the capability to search directions for driving and walking, report problems in the Maps application, and viewing street addresses to Maps via the Contacts application.

The Calendar app has enhancements such as being able to add Facebook events, view the map of a specified location, and an estimate for the travel time to an event.

The Safari browser has significantly enhanced JavaScript performance, which Apple claims is faster than Chrome and Firefox. A Top Sites view allows the user to quickly access the most viewed sites by default, but it can be customized by pinning or removing websites from the view. The sidebar now allows the user to view their bookmarks, reading list and shared links. Safari can also automatically generate random passwords and remember them through iCloud Keychain.

FaceTime is updated so that the user no longer needs to enable camera, in a similar manner to FaceTime in iOS 7. OS X Mavericks 10.9.2 added the option to block users in iMessage.

== Removed functionality ==
The Open Transport API has been removed. USB syncing of calendar, contacts and other information to iOS devices has been removed, instead requiring the use of iCloud. QuickTime 10 no longer supports many older video codecs and converts them to the ProRes format when opened. Older video codecs cannot be viewed in Quick Look. Apple also removed the ability to sync mobile iCloud Notes if iOS devices were upgraded from iOS 8 to iOS 9, effectively forcing all Mavericks users to update or upgrade their computers.

== Reception ==
OS X Mavericks has received mixed reviews. One complaint is that Apple removed the local sync services, which forces users to get iCloud to sync iOS devices with the desktop OS. However, this feature has since returned in the 10.9.3 and iTunes 11.2 updates.

The Verge stated that OS X Mavericks was "a gentle evolution of the Mac operating system".

CNET generalized OS X Mavericks as a "solid foundation" to OS X, lacking new features but praised it as a free update that incorporates additional iOS features. Criticism was brought to the insufficient updates to existing applications.

== Release history ==
Version	Build	Date	Darwin version	Notes
10.9	13A603	October 22, 2013	13.0	Original Mac App Store release (GM2)
10.9.1	13B42	December 16, 2013	13.0	
10.9.2	13C64	February 25, 2014	13.1	
10.9.2	13C1021	April 22, 2014	13.1	
10.9.3	13D65	May 15, 2014	13.2	
10.9.4	13E28	June 30, 2014	13.3	
10.9.5	13F34	September 17, 2014	13.4	
10.9.5	13F34	October 16, 2014	13.4	
10.9.5	13F34	January 27, 2015	13.4	
10.9.5	13F1066	March 9, 2015	13.4	
10.9.5	13F1077	April 8, 2015	13.4	
10.9.5	13F1096	June 30, 2015	13.4	
10.9.5	13F1112	August 13, 2015	13.4	
10.9.5	13F1134	October 21, 2015	13.4	
10.9.5	13F1507	December 8, 2015	13.4	
10.9.5	13F1603	January 19, 2016	13.4	
10.9.5	13F1712	March 21, 2016	13.4	
10.9.5	13F1808	May 16, 2016	13.4	
10.9.5	13F1911	July 18, 2016	13.4	

== Timeline ==
Timeline of Mac operating systems

== See also ==
- Aqua (user interface)
- macOS version history
- List of Macintosh software

Preceded by OS X 10.8 (Mountain Lion)	OS X 10.9 (Mavericks); 2013	Succeeded by OS X 10.10 (Yosemite)
