= Notification Center =

Feature in iOS and macOS

- Notification Center in iOS 14 showing a notification from the Wikipedia app
- Operating system: iOS; iPadOS; macOS; watchOS
- Website: www.apple.com/ios/

Notification Center is a feature in iOS, iPadOS, macOS and watchOS that provides an overview of alerts from applications. It displays notifications until the user completes an associated action, rather than requiring instant resolution. Users may choose what applications appear in Notification Center, and how they are handled. Initially released with iOS 5 in October 2011, Notification Center was made available on Macs as part of OS X Mountain Lion in July 2012.

== Changes by iOS version ==
iOS 6 added the ability to use Twitter and Facebook in the Notification Center, where users could post without going into the app. This saved resources.

iOS 7 overhauled the Notification Center, with both visual and functional changes. It has three tabs; "Today" (information on what's coming during the day), "All", and "Missed." Notifications are now visible on the phone's lock screen, and notifications are synchronized across devices, so users don't need to dismiss the same notification multiple times on different devices.

iOS 8 redesigned the Today View to allow widget functionality. Third-party developers can add widget support to their apps that let users see information in the Notification Center without having to open each respective app. Users can add, rearrange, or remove any widgets, at any time. Examples of widgets include a Weather app showing current weather, and a Calendar app showing upcoming events. Notifications themselves are now actionable, allowing users to reply to a message while it appears as a quick drop-down, or act on a notification through the Notification Center. The “Missed” menu was removed.

iOS 9 added a new battery widget to the Notification Center that displays the battery life and charging status of any connected Bluetooth device. It also makes it so that notifications can now be grouped by which app it came from.

In iOS 10, the Today view of Notification Center was redesigned and reworked to require swiping from left to right, while the widgets were also redesigned to look like notifications. Notifications, now larger, could expand to display more information; all unread notifications could be cleared at once using 3D Touch. Apps that need to be updated frequently were able to have notifications that update live. A Spotlight search bar was added to the notification center.

In iOS 11, the lock screen was revamped, the physical divide between the Lock Screen was removed, allowing users to see all notifications directly on the Lock Screen without entering a passcode, while the UI was also drastically simplified into only words. Scrolling up and down will either show or hide notifications.

In iOS 12, Notifications are now grouped by application and have a "manage" button to turn off notifications for that app or to deliver them quietly right from the Notification Center without having to go into the Settings application.

In iOS 13, scheduled summaries for notifications was added.

In iOS 14, the today view was replaced and with fully customizable widgets. These are far less flat and lack transparency, are more varied in size, and can appear in multiple colors. Notifications receive a new look with contact photos for all communication apps and larger app icons. When the notification arrives, the user can mute the corresponding app for one hour or all day. The Summary allows the user to group and postpone the notifications coming from the chosen apps, delivering them at a scheduled time in a single big notification called summary notification.

In iOS 16, the Notification Center was revamped. Notifications roll up from below the lock screen, rather than above, while it is possible to show notifications in three different styles: count, stack or list, replacing the banner option. Notifications can be grouped together with two fingers to reduce them to a counter. "Live Activities" now show a UI within a large notification that always stays on screen, and continuously updates to show users real time activity.

In iOS 17, the widget panels on the widget screen are now interactive.

In IOS 26, notification summaries were overhauled and renamed to AI Summaries. Additionally, the UI for the Notification Center was also redesigned.

== Features ==
Notification Center was released in iOS 5 to replace the previous system for dealing with push and local notifications. Instead of interrupting the user with an alert, Notification Center instead displays a banner at the top of the screen. This allows the user to continue using their device, and disappears after a set period of time. All previous notifications are collated into the Notification Center panel, which can be displayed in iOS by dragging down from the status bar, and in macOS by clicking on the notification center icon to the very right on the menu bar at the top of the screen (or using track-pad gestures, swiping from right to left). Notifications may be selected by the user, which redirects the user to the application where the notification was initially created, and marking that alert as read. Once a notification is read, it is removed from the panel. Users may also remove notifications without reading them by deleting individual alerts, or dismissing all of an application's alerts from within the application that is generating them. When an iOS device is locked, new notifications appear on the lock screen, and users may access the application generating the alert by swiping the application's icon with their finger from left to right along the notification.

Notification Center on macOS also includes Weather and Stocks widgets, displaying information on the weather at the user's current location, and any stocks that the user has selected in the Stocks application. This feature was not available on iPad or macOS until the release of iOS 7, which added the Weather widget to the iPad's Notification Center. Users could also select the option to display Twitter and Facebook buttons, allowing them to send tweets or update their status directly from Notification Center. In iOS 7, however, the option to send tweets or update Facebook statuses has been removed, and replaced with widgets.

Any application that uses the Push Notifications system provided by Apple, or local notifications, may use Notification Center. Users may customise what they want to appear in Notification Center, and may opt to stop certain applications appearing in the center, or sending alerts to their screen.

macOS users may also disable alerts and banners for a day, stopping notifications appearing on the screen. This can be achieved by either opening the Notification Center panel, scrolling upward, and toggling Do Not Disturb on, by holding the Option key while clicking on the Notification Center icon in the Menu Bar, or in System Preferences. However, any notifications sent during this time are still visible in the Notification Center panel. A similar service is included in iOS 6 as part of the Do Not Disturb feature.

== See also ==
- Control Center (iOS)
- Apple Push Notification Service
- Action Center
