= WGM =

WGM may refer to:

- Weil, Gotshal & Manges, a law firm based in New York city
- West Glamorgan, preserved county in Wales, Chapman code
- Woman Grandmaster, a high-ranking women's chess title
- World Gospel Mission, a Christian missionary agency headquartered in Marion, Indiana
- We Got Married, a South Korean reality show
- Workgroup Manager, a software program bundled as part of Mac OS X Server
- WGM (AM), an Atlanta, Georgia radio station that operated from March 1922 to July 1923
