= Server Monitor =

- Developer(s): Apple Computer Inc.
- Stable release: 1.1.2.1 / 2006-08-07
- Operating system: Mac OS X Server
- Type: Remote administration
- License: Proprietary

Server Monitor is Apple's remote server monitoring application, part of the discontinued Mac OS X Server. It communicates with the hwmond hardware monitoring daemon present on Mac servers. Server Monitor is also an IPMI 2.0-based tool for communicating with a remote baseboard management controller (BMC) that implements their lights-out management (LOM) system. LOM is only supported on Xserve models released after 2006, not on Power Macs sold as servers. LOM enables power management even if the Xserve is off, and even if it lacks an installed operating system. Server Monitor can be configured to send notifications by email when a server encounters a problem, which requires the application to be running; the remote servers can also send these emails by themselves through hwmond.
