= Xgrid =

Distributed computing protocol created by Apple

- Developer: Apple Inc.
- Release: January 6, 2004
- Final release: 10.7.5 / October 4, 2012; 14 years ago
- Operating system: Mac OS X
- Platform: Independent
- Type: Distributed computing
- License: Proprietary EULA
- Website: Homepage at the Wayback Machine (archived January 2, 2006)

Xgrid is a proprietary grid computing program and protocol developed by the Advanced Computation Group subdivision of Apple Inc.

It provides network administrators a method of creating a computing cluster, which allows them to exploit previously unused computational power for calculations that can be divided easily into smaller operations, such as Mandelbrot maps. The setup of an Xgrid cluster can be achieved at next to no cost, as Xgrid client is pre-installed on all computers running Mac OS X 10.4 to Mac OS X 10.7. The Xgrid client was not included in Mac OS X 10.8. The Xgrid controller, the job scheduler of the Xgrid operation, is also included within Mac OS X Server and as a free download from Apple. Apple has kept the command-line job control mechanism minimalist while providing an API to develop more sophisticated tools built around it.

The program employs its own communication protocol layered on top of a schema to communicate to other nodes. This communication protocol interfaces with the BEEP infrastructure, a network application protocol framework. Computers discovered by the Xgrid system, that is computers with Mac OS X's Xgrid service enabled, are automatically added to the list of available computers to use for processing tasks.

When the initiating computer sends the complete instructions, or job, for processing to the controller, the controller splits the task up into these small instruction packets, known as tasks. The design of the Xgrid system consists of these small packets being transferred to all the Xgrid-enabled computers on the network. These computers, or nodes, execute the instructions provided by the controller and then return the results. The controller assembles the individual task results into the whole job results and returns them to the initiating computer.

Apple modeled the design of Xgrid on the Zilla program, distributed with NeXT's OpenStep operating system application programming interface (API), which Apple owned the rights to. The company also opted to provide the client version of Mac OS X with only command-line functions and little flexibility, while giving the Mac OS X Server version of Xgrid a GUI control panel and a full set of features.

== History ==
Zilla

Xgrid's origins can be traced back to NeXT's Zilla application created by scientist Richard Crandall in the late 1980s. Zilla was the first distributed computing program released on an end-user operating system and which used the idle screen-saver motif, a design feature since found in widely used projects such as Seti@Home. Zilla won the national Computerworld Smithsonian Award (Science Category) in 1991 for ease of use and good design. Apple acquired Zilla along with the rest of NeXT in 1997, and used Zilla as inspiration for Xgrid. Xgrid Technology Preview 1 was released in January 2004, followed by Technology Preview 2 in November 2004. Xgrid 1.0 was released as part of Mac OS X 10.4 Tiger in April 2005.

Several organizations have adopted Xgrid in large international computing networks. One example of an Xgrid cluster is MacResearch's OpenMacGrid, where scientists can request access to large amounts of processing power to run tasks related to their research. Another was the now defunct Xgrid@Stanford project, which used a range of computers on the Stanford University campus and around the world to perform biochemical research.

In a report covering the announcement, Macworld cited Xgrid among the Unix features in "10 Things to Know about Tiger", calling it "handy if you work with huge amounts of experimental data or render complex animations". After Xgrid's introduction in 2004, InfoWorld noted that it was a "'preview' grade technology" which would directly benefit from the Xserve G5's launch later that year. InfoWorld commentator Ephraim Schwartz also predicted that Xgrid was an opening move in Apple's entry into the enterprise computing market.

Apple discontinued Xgrid with OS X 10.8 Mountain Lion, along with dependent services such as Podcast Producer.

== Protocol ==
Xgrid Protocol

The Xgrid protocol uses the BEEP network framework to communicate with nodes on the network. The system's infrastructure includes three types of computers which communicate over the protocol:

- The client, which submits calculation jobs to the controller
- The controller, which segregates the jobs into tasks, and assigns these tasks to agents
- The agents, which process their own allocated part of the calculation and return results to the controller, which returns them to the client.

A computer can act as one or all three of these components at the same time. The Xgrid protocol provides the basic infrastructure for computers to communicate, but is not involved in the processing of the specified calculation. Xgrid is targeted towards time-consuming computations that can be easily segregated into smaller tasks, sometimes called embarrassingly parallel tasks. This includes Monte Carlo calculations, 3D rendering and Mandelbrot maps.

Within the Xgrid protocol, three types of messages can be passed to other computers on the same cluster: requests, notifications and replies. Requests must be responded to by the recipient with a reply, notifications do not require a reply, and replies are responses to sent messages. They are identified by their name, type (request/notification/reply) and contents. Each message is encapsulated in a BEEP message (BEEP MSG) and is acknowledged on receipt by an empty reply (RPY). Xgrid does not leverage BEEPs message/reply infrastructure. Any received message which requires a response merely generates an independent BEEP message containing the reply. The Xgrid messages are encoded as dictionaries of key/value pairs which are converted to XML before being sent across the BEEP network.

== Architecture ==
The architecture of the Xgrid system is designed around a job based system; the controller sends agents jobs, and the agents return the responses. The actual computation that the controller executes in an Xgrid system is known as a job. The job contains all the files required to complete the task successfully, such as the input parameters, data files, directories, executables and/or shell scripts, the files included in an Xgrid job must be able to be executed either simultaneously or asynchronously, or any benefits of running such a job on an Xgrid is lost. Once the job completes, the controller can be set to notify the client of the task's completion or failure, for example by email. The client can leave the network while the tasks are running. It can also monitor the job status on demand by querying the controller, although it cannot track the ongoing progress of individual tasks.

The controller is central to the correct function of an Xgrid, as this node is responsible for the distribution, supervision and coordination of tasks on agents. The program running on the controller can assign and reassign tasks to handle individual agent failures on demand. The number of tasks assigned to an agent depend on two factors: the number of agents on an Xgrid and the number of processors in each node. The number of agents on an Xgrid determines how the controller will assign tasks. The tasks may be assigned simultaneously for a large number of agents, or queued for a small number of agents. When a node with more than one processor is detected on an Xgrid, the controller may assign one task per processor; this only occurs if the number of agents on the network is lower than the number of tasks the controller has to complete.

Xgrid is layered upon the Blocks Extensible Exchange Protocol (BEEP), an IETF standard comparable to HTTP, but with a focus on two-way multiplexed communication, such as that found in peer-to-peer networks. BEEP, in turn, uses XML to define profiles for communicating between multiple agents over a single network or internet connection.

Xgrid agent software was available for Unix and Linux systems.

== Interface ==
Xgrid administration tool

While it is possible to access Xgrid from the command line, the Xgrid graphical user interface, a program bundled with Mac OS X Server and, as of March 2009, available online, is a much more efficient way of administering an Xgrid system. Originally, the Xgrid agent was included in all Mac OS X 10.4 Tiger installations but the GUI was reserved for users of Mac OS X Server. This decision limited the efforts of the computer community to embrace the platform. Eventually, Apple released the Mac OS X Server Administration Tools to the public, which included the Xgrid administration application bundled with Mac OS X Server.

Despite the lack of a graphical controller interface in the standard (non-server) Mac OS X distribution, it is possible to set up an Xgrid controller via the command line tools xgridctl and xgrid. Once the Xgrid controller daemon is running, administration of the grid with Apple's Xgrid Admin tool is possible. Some applications, such as VisualHub, provided Xgrid controller capability through their user interfaces.

== See also ==
- Condor High-Throughput Computing System
