= Mac OS X Tiger =

2005 operating system version

Mac OS X 10.4 Tiger
- Version of the macOS operating system

- Screenshot of Mac OS X 10.4 Tiger. The Apple logo on the menu bar has been changed to the one with a less glossy appearance.
- Developer: Apple Inc.
- OS family: Macintosh; Unix-like
- Working state: No longer supported
- Source model: Closed, with open source components
- General availability: April 29, 2005; 21 years ago
- Latest release: 10.4.11 / November 14, 2007; 19 years ago
- Update method: Apple Software Update
- Supported platforms: IA-32, x86-64, PowerPC
- Kernel type: Hybrid (XNU)
- License: Commercial proprietary software
- Preceded by: Mac OS X 10.3 Panther
- Succeeded by: Mac OS X 10.5 Leopard
- Official website: Mac OS X Tiger (archived at Wayback Machine)
- Tagline: Tiger unleashed.

Support status
- Historical, unsupported as of September 4, 2009. Safari support ended November 2010 and iTunes support terminated as well.

Mac OS X Tiger (version 10.4) is the fifth major release of macOS, Apple's desktop and server operating system for Mac computers. Tiger was released to the public on April 29, 2005, for US$129.95 as the successor to Mac OS X 10.3 Panther. Included features were a fast searching system called Spotlight, a new version of the Safari web browser, Dashboard, a new 'Unified' theme, and improved support for 64-bit addressing on Power Mac G5s. Tiger also had a number of additional features that Microsoft had spent several years struggling to add to Windows with acceptable performance, such as fast file search and improved graphics processing.

Mac OS X 10.4 Tiger was included with all new Macs, and was also available as an upgrade for existing Mac OS X users, or users of supported pre-Mac OS X systems. The server edition, Mac OS X Server 10.4, was also available for some Macintosh product lines. Six weeks after the official release, Apple had delivered 2 million copies of Tiger, representing 16% of all Mac OS X users. Apple claimed that Tiger was the most successful Apple operating system release in the company's history. On June 11, 2007, at WWDC 2007, Apple's CEO Steve Jobs announced that more than 67% of the 22 million Mac OS X users were using Tiger.

Apple announced a transition to Intel x86 processors during Tiger's lifetime, making it the first Apple operating system to work on Apple–Intel architecture machines. The original Apple TV, released in March 2007, shipped with a customized version of Tiger branded "Apple TV OS" that replaced the usual GUI with an updated version of Front Row.

Mac OS X 10.4 Tiger was succeeded by Mac OS X 10.5 Leopard on October 26, 2007, after 30 months, making Tiger the longest-running version of Mac OS X. The last security update released for Tiger users was the 2009-005 update. The latest supported version of QuickTime is 7.6.4. The latest version of iTunes that can run on Tiger is 9.2.1. Safari 4.1.3 is the final version for Tiger.

Despite not having received security updates since 2009, Tiger remains popular with Power Mac users and retrocomputing enthusiasts due to its wide software and hardware compatibility, as it is the last Mac OS X version to support the Classic Environment – a Mac OS 9 compatibility layer – and PowerPC G3 processors.

== System requirements ==
Mac OS X 10.4 Tiger was initially available in a PowerPC edition, with an Intel edition released beginning at version 10.4.4. There is no universal version of the client operating system, although Mac OS X 10.4 Tiger Server was made available on a universal DVD from version 10.4.7. While Apple shipped the PowerPC edition bundled with PowerPC-based Macs and also sold it as a separate retail box, the only way to obtain the Intel version was to buy an Intel-based Mac bundled with it. However, it was possible to buy the 'restore' DVDs containing the Intel version through unofficial channels such as eBay, and officially through Apple if one could provide proof of purchase of the appropriate Intel Mac. These grey-colored 'restore' DVDs supplied with new Macs, are designed to only restore on the model of Mac that they are intended for. However, they can be modified to work on any Intel Mac. The retail PowerPC-only DVD can be used on any PowerPC-based Mac supported by Tiger.

The system requirements of the PowerPC edition are:

- Macintosh computer with a PowerPC G3, G4 or G5 family processor
- Built-in FireWire
- DVD drive for installation
- 256MB of RAM
- 3GB of available hard disk space (4GB if the user installs the developer tools)

Mac OS X 10.4 Tiger removed support for older New World ROM Macs such as the original iMacs and iBooks that were supported in Mac OS X 10.3 Panther; however it is possible to install Mac OS X 10.4 Tiger on these Macs using third-party software (such as XPostFacto) that overrides the checks made at the beginning of the installation process. Likewise, machines such as beige Power Mac G3s and 'Wall Street' PowerBook G3s that were dropped by Mac OS X Panther can also be made to run both Mac OS X Panther and Mac OS X Tiger in this way. Also, Tiger can be installed on unsupported New World ROM Macs by installing it on a supported Mac, then swapping hard drives. Old World ROM Macs require the use of XPostFacto to install Tiger.

Tiger was the last version of Mac OS X to support the PowerPC G3 family of processors.

== History ==
The name "Mac OS X Tiger" was reported by Mac Magazine on March 30, 2004; according to Mac Magazine, this information came from a safe source. Furthermore, Mac Magazine reported that the internal codename for Mac OS X Tiger had been "Merlot".

Apple mentioned Mac OS X Tiger by name in a press release published on May 4, 2004, for its upcoming WWDC 2004 event.

Apple CEO Steve Jobs first presented Mac OS X 10.4 Tiger in his keynote presentation at the WWDC on June 28, 2004. In October and December 2004, several non-commercial developers' releases of Tiger leaked onto the internet via BitTorrent file sharers. Apple sued these file sharers. On April 12, 2005, Apple announced Tiger's worldwide release would be April 29. All Apple Stores around the world held Tiger seminars, presentations and demos.

On June 6, 2005, at the WWDC in San Francisco, Jobs reported that nearly two million copies had been sold in Tiger's first six weeks of release, making Tiger the most successful operating system release in Apple's history. Jobs then disclosed that Mac OS X had been engineered from its inception to work with Intel's x86 line of processors in addition to the PowerPC, the CPU for which the operating system had always been publicly marketed. Apple concurrently announced its intent to release the first x86-based computers in June 2006, and to move the rest of its computers to x86 microprocessors by June 2007. On January 10, 2006, Apple presented its new iMac and MacBook Pro computers running on Intel Core Duo processors, and announced that the entire Apple product line would run on Intel processors by the end of 2006. Apple then released the Mac Pro and announced the new Xserve on August 8, completing the Intel transition in 210 days, roughly ten months ahead of the original schedule.

Tiger is the first version of Mac OS X to be supplied on a DVD rather than a CD, although the DVD could originally be exchanged for CDs for $9.95.

== Reception ==
John Siracusa, writing for Ars Technica, wrote that some features in Tiger were half-baked, such as filesystem metadata, Spotlight, and Dashboard. According to Siracusa, Spotlight in Tiger is confusing because it has two disparate interfaces which are kept separate, yet can accomplish the same task. Siracusa also wrote that some of Dashboard's UI choices were strange.

== New and changed features ==
=== End-user features ===
Apple advertised that Mac OS X 10.4 Tiger had over 150 new and improved features, including:

- Spotlight — Spotlight is a full-text and metadata search engine that can search everything on one's Mac, including Microsoft Word documents, iCal calendars and Address Book contact cards. The feature is also used to build the concept of 'smart folders' into the Finder. Spotlight will index files as they are saved, so they can be quickly and easily found through a search-as-you-type box in the menu bar. As a side-effect, it adds hidden folders and indexing files to removable media like USB flash drives.
- iChat AV — The new iChat AV 3.0 in Tiger supports up to four participants in a video conference and ten participants in an audio conference. It also now supports communication using the XMPP protocol. An XMPP server called iChat Server is included on Mac OS X 10.4 Tiger Server.
- Safari RSS — The new Safari 2.0 web browser in Tiger featured a built-in reader for RSS and Atom web syndication that can be accessed easily from an RSS button in the address bar of the web browser window. An updated version of Safari, included as part of the free 10.4.3 update, can also pass the Acid2 web standards test.
- Mail 2 — The new version of Mail.app email client included in Tiger featured an updated interface, "Smart Mailboxes", which utilizes the Spotlight search system, parental controls, as well as several other features.
- Automator — A scripting tool to link applications together to form complex automated workflows (written in AppleScript, Cocoa, or both). Automator came with a complete library of actions for several applications that can be used together to make a Workflow.
- VoiceOver — screen reader interface similar to Jaws for Windows and other Windows screen readers that offers the blind and visually impaired user keyboard control and spoken English descriptions of what is happening on screen. VoiceOver enables users with visual impairment to use applications via keyboard commands. VoiceOver is capable of reading aloud the contents of files including web pages, mail messages and word processing files. Complete keyboard navigation lets the user control the computer with the keyboard rather than the mouse, a menu is displayed in a window showing all the available keyboard commands that can be used.
- A complete built-in Dictionary/Thesaurus based on the New Oxford American Dictionary, Second Edition, accessible through an application, Dictionary, a Dashboard widget, and as a system-wide command (see below).
- .Mac syncing — Though this was not a new feature, .Mac syncing in Tiger is much improved over Panther. Syncing tasks in Tiger are now accomplished through the .Mac system preferences pane rather than the iSync application.
- QuickTime 7 — A new version of Apple's multimedia software has support for the new H.264/AVC codec, which offers better quality and scalability than other video codecs. This new codec is used by iChat AV for clearer video conferencing. New classes within Cocoa provide full access to QuickTime for Cocoa application developers. The new QuickTime 7 player application bundled with Tiger now includes more advanced audio and video controls as well as a more detailed Information dialog, and the new player has been rebuilt using Apple's Cocoa API to take advantage of the new technologies more easily.
- New Unix features — New versions of cp, mv, and rsync that support files with resource forks. Command-line support for features such as the above-mentioned Spotlight is also included.
- Xcode 2.0 — Xcode 2.0, Apple's Cocoa development tool now includes visual modelling, an integrated Apple Reference Library and graphical remote debugging.

=== New applications in Tiger ===
- Dashboard — The Dashboard is a new mini-applications layer based on HTML, CSS, and JavaScript, which returns the desk accessories concept to Mac OS. These accessories are known as widgets. It comes with several widgets such as Weather, World Clock, Unit Converter, Dictionary/Thesaurus, and others (full list). More are available to download for free online. Its similarity to the Konfabulator application caused some criticism.
- Automator — Automator uses workflows to process repetitive tasks automatically.
- Grapher — Grapher is a new application capable of creating 2D and 3D graphs similar to those of Graphing Calculator.
- Dictionary — A dictionary and thesaurus program that uses the New Oxford American Dictionary. It has a fast GUI for displaying the Dictionary, and allows the user to search the dictionary with Spotlight, to print definitions, and to copy and paste text into documents. Dictionary also provides a Dictionary service in the Application menu, and Cocoa and WebKit provide a global keyboard shortcut (ctrl-⌘-D by default) for all applications that display text with them. Its use was furthered in Mac OS X Leopard by providing definitions from Wikipedia. The Dictionary application is a more feature-filled version of the Dictionary widget.
- Quartz Composer — Quartz Composer is a development tool for processing and rendering graphical data.
- AU Lab — AU Lab is a developer application for testing and mixing Audio Units.

== Improvements ==
- An upgraded kernel with optimized kernel resource locking and access control lists, and with support for 64-bit userland address spaces on machines with 64-bit processors.
- An updated libSystem with both 32-bit and 64-bit versions; combined with the aforementioned kernel change, this allows individual applications to address more than 4 GB of memory when run on 64-bit processors, although an application using Apple libraries or frameworks other than libSystem would need to have two processes, one running the 64-bit code and one running the code that requires other libraries and frameworks.
- A new startup daemon called launchd that allows for faster booting.
- The printing dialog in Tiger now features a drop down menu for creating PDFs, sending PDFs to Mail, and other PDF related actions. However, the user interface was criticized for creating a hybrid UI element that looks like a plain button but acts like a pop-up menu. This is one of only three places in the entire Mac OS X interface where such an element appears.
- Dock menus now have menu items to open an application at login, or to remove the icon from the dock.
- The Window menu in the Finder now features a "Cycle Through Windows" menu item.
- The Get Info window for items in the Finder now includes a "More Info" section that includes Spotlight information tags such as Image Height & Width, when the file was last opened, and where the file originated.
- Early development of resolution independence. Apple notes that this will be a user-level feature in a future version of Mac OS X. Among the changes, the maximum size of icons was increased to 256x256. However, the Finder does not yet support this size.

=== Technologies ===
- Core Image: A graphics processing API that allows programmers to leverage programmable GPUs for fast image processing for special effects and image correction tools. Some of the included Image Units are Blur, Color Blending, Generator Filters, Distortion Filters, Geometry Filters, and Halftone features.
- Core Data: A data persistence API that makes it easier for developers to handle structured data in their applications. Core Data provides undo, redo, and save functions for developers without them having to write any code.
- Core Video: A video graphics API that leverages Core Image to provide real-time video processing. Apple's Motion real-time video effects program takes advantage of Core Video in Tiger. Core Video lets developers easily integrate real-time video effects and processing into their applications.
- Core Audio: Integrates a range of audio functionality directly into the operating system.

In addition to these APIs, Tiger introduces a new window theme, often described as 'Unified'. A variation on the standard, non-brushed metal theme used since the introduction of Mac OS X, this theme integrates the title bar and the toolbar of a window. A prominent example of an application that utilizes this theme is Mail.

Tiger is also the first version of Mac OS X to include the "Zoom" screen magnifier functionality.

== Tiger trademark lawsuit ==
Shortly before the release of Mac OS X Tiger, the computer retailer TigerDirect.com, Inc. filed a lawsuit against Apple, alleging that Apple infringed TigerDirect.com's trademark with the Mac OS X Tiger operating system.

The following is a quotation from TigerDirect.com's court memorandum:

Apple Computer's use of its infringing family of Tiger marks to expand sales of products besides its operating system software is already evident — for example, Apple Computer is offering free iPods and laptops as part of its Tiger World Premiere giveaway. In short, notwithstanding its representation to the PTO that it would only use Tiger in connection with their unique computer operating system software, Apple Computer has in recent weeks used a family of Tiger marks in connection with a substantially broader group of products and services, including the very products and services currently offered by Tiger Direct under its famous family of Tiger marks.

In 2005 TigerDirect was denied a preliminary injunction that would have prevented Apple from using the mark while the case was decided. Apple and TigerDirect reached a settlement in 2006, after which TigerDirect withdrew its opposition.

== Support for Intel processors ==
At Apple's 2005 Worldwide Developers Conference, CEO Steve Jobs announced that the company would begin selling Mac computers with Intel x86 processors in 2006. To allow developers to begin producing software for these Intel-based Macs, Apple made available a prototype Intel-based Mac ("Developer Transition Kit") that included a version of Mac OS X v10.4.1 compiled to run on x86 processors.

This build included Apple's Rosetta compatibility layer — a translation process that allows x86-based Macs to run software built only for PowerPC, with a moderate performance penalty. This is contrasted with the contemporary Mac OS 9 Classic mode, which used a comparatively large amount of system resources.

Soon after the Developer Transition Kits began shipping, copies of Tiger x86 were leaked onto file sharing networks. Although Apple had implemented a Trusted Computing digital rights management scheme in the transition hardware and OS in an attempt to stop people installing Tiger x86 on non-Apple PCs, the OSx86 project soon managed to remove this restriction. As Apple released each update with newer safeguards to prevent its use on non-Apple hardware, unofficially modified versions were released that circumvented Apple's safeguards. However, with the release of 10.4.5, 10.4.6, and 10.4.7 the unofficially modified versions continued to use the kernel from 10.4.4 because later kernels have hardware locks and depend heavily on EFI. By late 2006, the 10.4.8 kernel had been cracked.

At MacWorld San Francisco 2006, Jobs announced the immediate availability of Mac OS X v10.4.4, the first publicly available release of Tiger compiled for both PowerPC- and Intel x86-based machines. This version was the first version, other than the version provided with the Developer Transition Kits, to include Rosetta.

== Release history ==
Version	Build	Date	Darwin version	Notes
10.4	8A428	April 29, 2005	8.0	Preinstalled on much of the new line of computers
10.4	8A432	April 29, 2005	8.0	Original retail release
10.4.1	8B15	May 16, 2005	8.1	Improved reliability, particularly in networking; improved compatibility with software and hardware devices. Also addresses a widget auto-installation issue.
10.4.1	8B17	May 19, 2005	8.1	Server edition
10.4.2	8C46	July 12, 2005	8.2	
10.4.2	8C47	July 12, 2005	8.2	Server edition
10.4.2	8E102	October 12, 2005	8.2	Exclusively for Front Row iMac G5 released on same date
10.4.2	8E45	October 19, 2005	8.2	Exclusively for PowerBook G4s released on same date
10.4.2	8E90	October 19, 2005	8.2	Exclusively for Power Mac G5 Dual and Quad released on same date
10.4.3	8F46	October 31, 2005	8.3	
10.4.3	8F1111	November, 2005		Intel
10.4.4	8G32	January 10, 2006	8.4	PowerPC
10.4.4	8G1165	January 10, 2006	8.4	Shipped on initial Intel-based Macs
10.4.5	8H14	February 14, 2006	8.5	PowerPC
10.4.5	8G1454	February 14, 2006	8.5	Intel
10.4.6	8I127	April 3, 2006	8.6	PowerPC; Final retail release
10.4.6	8I1119	April 3, 2006	8.6	Intel
10.4.7	8J135	June 27, 2006	8.7	PowerPC
10.4.7	8J2135a	June 27, 2006	8.7	Intel
10.4.7	8K1079	August 7, 2006	8.7	Exclusively for Mac Pro released the same date
10.4.7	8N5107	August 7, 2006	8.7	Exclusively for Apple TV (formerly codenamed iTV)
10.4.8	8L127	September 29, 2006	8.8	PowerPC
10.4.8	8L2127	September 29, 2006	8.8	Intel and Universal Server Edition
10.4.9	8P135	March 13, 2007	8.9	PowerPC
10.4.9	8P2137	March 13, 2007	8.9	Intel and Universal Server Edition
10.4.10	8R218	June 20, 2007	8.10	PowerPC
10.4.10	8R2218	June 20, 2007	8.10	Intel and Universal Server Edition
10.4.10	8R2232	June 20, 2007	8.10	Intel and Universal Server Edition
10.4.11	8S165	November 14, 2007	8.11	PowerPC
10.4.11	8S2167	November 14, 2007	8.11	Intel and Universal Server Edition

== Timeline ==
Timeline of Mac operating systems

Preceded by Mac OS X 10.3 (Panther)	Mac OS X 10.4 (Tiger); 2005	Succeeded by Mac OS X 10.5 (Leopard)
