= Workgroup Manager =

- Developer(s): Apple Computer
- Stable release: 10.9 (421) / October 22, 2013
- Operating system: OS X, OS X Server
- Type: Utility
- License: Proprietary
- Website: https://www.apple.com/macosx/server/

Workgroup Manager is a computer program bundled as part of OS X Server for directory-based management of users, groups and computers across a network.

This is where an admin could add, delete, and modify computer, and user accounts and groups. Computer accounts allow preferences to be set for individual machines. Machines are entered with their MAC address for the interface which they connect.

== See also ==
- Group Policy
