= Mac OS X Server =

Server software for macOS

- Mac OS X Snow Leopard Server running Server Admin on Desktop
- Developer: Apple
- Written in: C, C++, Objective-C, and HTML for settings
- OS family: Macintosh; Unix
- Working state: Discontinued
- Source model: Closed-source (with open-source components)
- Initial release: March 16, 1999; 27 years ago
- Final release: 5.12 / December 8, 2021
- Available in: English, Japanese, French, German, Simplified Chinese, Dutch, Italian, Korean, Spanish, Traditional Chinese
- Supported platforms: x86-64; (Formerly PPC, IA-32)
- Kernel type: Hybrid (XNU) (mostly monolithic)
- Default user interface: Aqua
- License: Commercial proprietary software
- Official website: Mac OS X Server at the Wayback Machine (archived 2020-11-09)

Support status
- Discontinued on April 21, 2022

Mac OS X Server is a series of discontinued Unix server operating systems developed by Apple, based on macOS. It provided server functionality and system administration tools, and tools to manage both macOS-based computers and iOS-based devices, network services such as a mail transfer agent, AFP and SMB servers, an LDAP server, and a domain name server, as well as server applications including a Web server, database, and calendar server.

Starting with OS X Lion, Apple stopped selling a standalone server operating system, instead releasing an add-on Server app marketed as OS X Server (and later macOS Server), which was sold through the Mac App Store. The Server app lacked many features from Mac OS X Server, and later versions of the app only included functionality related to user and group management, Xsan, and mobile device management through profiles. The Server app was discontinued on April 21, 2022, and Apple said that later versions of macOS would drop support for it.

== History ==
Box artwork for Mac OS X Server versions 10.1–10.6

Mac OS X Server is based on an open source foundation called Darwin and uses open industry standards and protocols. Mac OS X Server was provided as the operating system for Xserve computers, a series of rack-mounted server computers designed by Apple. It was optionally pre-installed on the Mac Mini and Mac Pro and was sold separately for use on any Macintosh computer meeting its minimum requirements.

=== Mac OS X Server 1.0 (Rhapsody) ===
Mac OS X Server 1.0 was released in March 1999, predating the release of the consumer version of Mac OS X by two years. Mac OS X Server 1.0 was based on Rhapsody, a hybrid of OPENSTEP from NeXT Computer and Mac OS 8.5.1. The GUI looked like a mixture of Mac OS 8's Platinum appearance with OPENSTEP's NeXT-based interface. It included a runtime layer called Blue Box for running legacy Mac OS-based applications within a separate window. There was discussion of implementing a 'transparent blue box' which would intermix Mac OS applications with those written for Rhapsody's Yellow Box environment, but this would not happen until Mac OS X's Classic environment. Apple File Services, Macintosh Manager, QuickTime Streaming Server, WebObjects, and NetBoot were included with Mac OS X Server 1.0. It could not use FireWire devices. The last release is Mac OS X Server 1.2v3.

=== Mac OS X Server 10.0 (Cheetah) ===
Mac OS X Server 10.0 (released May 21, 2001) included the new Aqua user interface, Apache, PHP, MySQL, Tomcat, WebDAV support, Macintosh Manager, and NetBoot.

=== Mac OS X Server 10.1 (Puma) ===
Mac OS X Server 10.1 (released September 25, 2001) featured improved performance, increased system stability, and decreased file transfer times compared to Mac OS X Server 10.0. Support was added for RAID 0 and RAID 1 storage configurations, and Mac OS 9.2.1 in NetBoot.

=== Mac OS X Server 10.2 (Jaguar) ===
Mac OS X Server 10.2 (released August 23, 2002) includes updated Open Directory user and file management, which with this release is based on LDAP, beginning the deprecation of the NeXT-originated NetInfo architecture. The new Workgroup Manager interface improved configuration significantly. The release also saw major updates to NetBoot and NetInstall. Many common network services are provided such as NTP, SNMP, web server (Apache), mail server (Postfix and Cyrus), LDAP (OpenLDAP), AFP, and print server. The inclusion of Samba version 3 allows tight integration with Windows clients and servers. MySQL v4.0.16 and PHP v4.3.7 are also included.

=== Mac OS X Server 10.3 (Panther) ===
Mac OS X Server 10.3 (released October 24, 2003) release includes updated Open Directory user and file management, which with this release is based on LDAP, beginning the deprecation of the NeXT-originated NetInfo architecture. The new Workgroup Manager interface improved configuration significantly. Many common network services are provided such as NTP, SNMP, web server (Apache), mail server (Postfix and Cyrus), LDAP (OpenLDAP), AFP, and print server. The inclusion of Samba version 3 allows tight integration with Windows clients and servers. MySQL v4.0.16 and PHP v4.3.7 are also included.

=== Mac OS X Server 10.4 (Tiger) ===
The 10.4 release (April 29, 2005) adds 64-bit application support, Access Control Lists, Xgrid, link aggregation, e-mail spam filtering (SpamAssassin), virus detection (ClamAV), Gateway Setup Assistant, and servers for Software Update, iChat Server using XMPP, Boot Camp Assistant, Dashboard, and Weblog Server based on the open-source Blojsom project (Java).

On August 10, 2006, Apple announced the first Universal Binary release of Mac OS X Server, version 10.4.7, supporting both PowerPC and Intel processors. At the same time Apple announced the release of the Intel-based Mac Pro and Xserve systems.

=== Mac OS X Server 10.5 (Leopard) ===
Screenshot of OS X Leopard 10.5 Server

Leopard Server (released October 26, 2007) sold for $999 for an unlimited-client license. Mac OS X Server version 10.5.x 'Leopard' was the last major version of Mac OS X Server to support PowerPC-based servers and workstations, such as the Apple Xserve G5 and Power Mac G5. NetInfo was completely phased out and removed in Leopard.

Features:

- RADIUS Server. Leopard Server includes FreeRADIUS for network authentication. It ships with support for wireless access stations however can be modified into a fully functioning FreeRADIUS server.
- Ruby on Rails. Mac OS X Server version 10.5 'Leopard' was the first version to ship with Ruby on Rails, the server-side Web application framework used by sites such as GitHub.

=== Mac OS X Server 10.6 (Snow Leopard) ===
Mac OS X Snow Leopard Server (released August 28, 2009) sold for $499 and included unlimited client licenses.

New Features:

- Full 64-bit operating system. On appropriate systems with 4 GB of RAM or more, Snow Leopard Server uses a 64-bit kernel to address up to a theoretical 16 TB of RAM.
- iCal Server 2 with improved CalDAV support, a new web calendaring application, push notifications and the ability to send email invitations to non-iCal users.
- Address Book Server provides a central location for users to store and access personal contacts across multiple Macs and synchronized iPhones. Based on the CardDAV protocol standard.
- Wiki Server 2, with server side Quick Look and the ability to view wiki content on iPhone.
- A new Mail server engine that supports push email so users receive immediate access to new messages. However, Apple's implementation of push email is not supported for Apple's iPhone.
- Podcast Producer 2 with dual-source video support. Also includes a new Podcast Composer application to automate the production process, making it simple to create podcasts with a customized, consistent look and feel. Podcast Composer creates a workflow to add titles, transitions and effects, save to a desired format and share to wikis, blogs, iTunes, iTunes U, Final Cut Server or Podcast Library.
- Mobile Access Server enables iPhone and Mac users to access secured network services, including corporate websites, online business applications, email, calendars and contacts. Without requiring additional software, Mobile Access Server acts as a reverse proxy server and provides SSL encryption and authentication between the user's iPhone or Mac and a private network.

=== Server app (From Mac OS X Lion to macOS Sierra) ===
The Server app running on OS X Yosemite

In releasing the developer preview of Mac OS X Lion in February 2011, Apple indicated that beginning with Lion, Mac OS X Server would be bundled with the operating system and would not be marketed as a separate product. However, a few months later, the company said it would instead sell the server components as a US$49.99 add-on to Lion, distributed through the Mac App Store (as well as Lion itself). The combined cost of an upgrade to Lion and the purchase of the OS X Server add-on, which costs approximately US$50, was nonetheless significantly lower than the retail cost of Snow Leopard Server (US$499). Lion Server came with unlimited client licenses as did Snow Leopard Server. Lion Server includes new versions of iCal Server, Wiki Server, and Mail Server. More significantly, Lion Server can be used for iOS mobile device management. Starting with Lion, PostgreSQL replaced MySQL as the database provided, coinciding with Oracle Corporation's acquisition of Sun Microsystems and Oracle's subsequent attempts to tighten MySQL's licensing restrictions and to exert influence on MySQL's previously open and independent development model.

Like Lion, Mountain Lion had no separate server edition. An OS X Server package was available for Mountain Lion from the Mac App Store for US$19.99, which included a server management application called Server, as well as other additional administrative tools to manage client profiles and Xsan. Mountain Lion Server, like Lion Server, was provided with unlimited client licenses, and once purchased could be run on an unlimited number of systems.

Server 5.7 (released September 28, 2018) stopped bundling open source services such as Calendar Server, Contacts Server, the Mail Server, DNS, DHCP, VPN Server, and Websites. Included services are now limited to Profile Manager, Open Directory and Xsan.

Server 5.8 (released March 25, 2019) added new restrictions, payloads, and commands to Profile Manager.

The Server app does not support versions of macOS newer than Monterey, marking the end of Mac OS X Server product line.

== Bundled applications ==
=== Prior to OS X Mountain Lion ===
One of Mac OS X Server's main administrative tools was the Server Administrator app, which allowed users to configure server services, and turn them on or off.

RAID Admin was a utility for administering and controlling RAIDs, usually Xserve RAIDs. It was written in Java, and could run on Windows or Linux.

Other bundled tools include:

- Server Preferences (application)
- Server Assistant – a wizard that guides the administrator through setting up functions of Mac OS X Server. It is the first program that is run after an install of Mac OS X Server and can be run again to execute further configuration on a remote or local server. It is also capable of executing remote installation of software onto the server as well.
- Server Monitor
- System Image Utility
- Workgroup Manager
- Xgrid Admin

=== After OS X Mountain Lion ===
Beginning with the release of OS X Mountain Lion (version 10.8), there is only one Administrative tool, an app called "Server", which can be bought and downloaded from the Mac App Store, and is updated independently of OS X. This Server tool is used to configure, maintain and monitor one or more macOS Server installations.

== Server services ==
Apple's Address Book Server, iCal Server, Wiki Server, and Web Server are mostly written in the Python programming language, relying on the Twisted framework. Most of these services were discontinued and removed in version 5.7.1 of the Server app, released on September 30, 2018.

=== Address Book Server ===
Address Book Server is a contacts server, and the first commercial server to have implemented CardDAV, which relies on the WebDAV protocol. It was added in Mac OS X Server 10.6.

=== iCal Server ===
iCal Server is the first commercial calendar server to have implemented the CalDAV standard, built on top of WebDAV. iCal Server was added in Mac OS X Server 10.5, and was also released under the open-source Apache License 2.0 as Darwin Calendar Server.

The server, named "caldavd", is a daemon background service. It has been ported to non-Apple computer platforms. It is currently possible to install it on FreeBSD and several flavours of Linux. The server uses an SQL database for storage of calendar data.

=== iChat Server ===
iChat Server is an XMPP server that was added in Mac OS X Server 10.4, and was upgraded to version 2 with the release of Mac OS X 10.5 Server in October 2007. iChat Server was originally based on jabberd 1.4.3 and is named after Apple's iChat online chat client software. Version 2 of the software is based on jabberd2 2.0s9 and supports server federation, which allows chat clients to talk directly with other systems that support XMPP. It also supports server-based chat archiving.

=== Wiki Server ===
Wiki Server was a set of services which have shipped with all versions of Mac OS X Server since v10.5 until macOS High Sierra. Mac OS X Server includes web-based Wiki, Weblog, Calendaring, and Contact services. Additionally, it includes a Cocoa application called Directory which allows directory viewing as well as enabling of group services.

Server 5.7.1, the version aligned with macOS 10.14 and released on September 30, 2018, removed the Wiki Server functionality from Server.app.

== Discontinuation ==
On April 21, 2022, Apple announced that they have discontinued macOS Server and that the most popular features (Caching Server, File Sharing Server, and Time Machine Server) are already bundled with every copy of macOS High Sierra and later, so customers will still have access to them. Existing macOS Server customers can still download and use the app with macOS Monterey.

== Technical specifications ==
File and print services

- Mac (AFP, AppleTalk PAP, IPP)
- Windows (SMB/CIFS: Apple SMBX in Lion Server — previously Samba 2, IPP)
- Unix-like systems (NFS, LPR/LPD, IPP)
- Internet (FTP, WebDAV)

Directory services and authentication

- Open Directory (OpenLDAP, Kerberos, SASL)
- Windows NT Domain Services (removed in Lion Server, previously Samba 2)
- Backup Domain Controller (BDC)
- LDAP directory connector
- Active Directory connector
- BSD configuration files (/etc)
- RADIUS

Mail services

- SMTP (Postfix)
- POP and IMAP (Dovecot)
- SSL/TLS encryption (OpenSSL)
- Mailing lists (Mailman)
- Webmail (RoundCube)
- Junk mail filtering (SpamAssassin)
- Virus detection (ClamAV)

Calendaring

- iCal Server (CalDAV, iTIP, iMIP)

Web hosting

- Apache Web server (2.2 and 1.3)
- SSL/TLS (OpenSSL)
- WebDAV
- Perl (5.8.8), PHP (5.2), Ruby (1.8.6), Rails (1.2.3)
- MySQL 5 (replaced by PostgreSQL in Lion Server)
- Capistrano, Mongrel

Collaboration services

- Wiki Server (RSS)
- iChat Server 3 (XMPP)

Application servers

- Apache Tomcat (6)
- Java SE virtual machine
- WebObjects deployment (5.4)
- Apache Axis (SOAP)

Media streaming

- QuickTime Streaming Server 6 (removed in Lion Server)
- QuickTime Broadcaster 1.5

Client management

- Managed Preferences
- NetBoot
- NetInstall
- Software Update Server
- Portable home directories
- Profile Manager (new in Lion Server)

Networking and VPN

- DNS server (BIND 9)
- DHCP server
- NAT server
- VPN server (L2TP/IPSec, PPTP)
- Firewall (IPFW2)
- NTP

Distributed computing

- Xgrid 2

High-availability features

- Automatic recovery
- File system journaling
- IP failover (dropped in OS X 10.7 and later)
- Software RAID
- Disk space monitor

File systems

- HFS+ (journaled, case sensitive and case insensitive)
- FAT
- NTFS (write support only available on Mac OS X Snow Leopard Server)
- UFS (read-only)

Management features

- Server Assistant
- Server Admin
- Server Preferences
- Server Status widget
- Workgroup Manager
- System Image Utility
- Secure Shell (SSH2)
- Server Monitor
- RAID Utility
- SNMPv3 (Net-SNMP)
