= Xserve =

Apple rack-mounted server

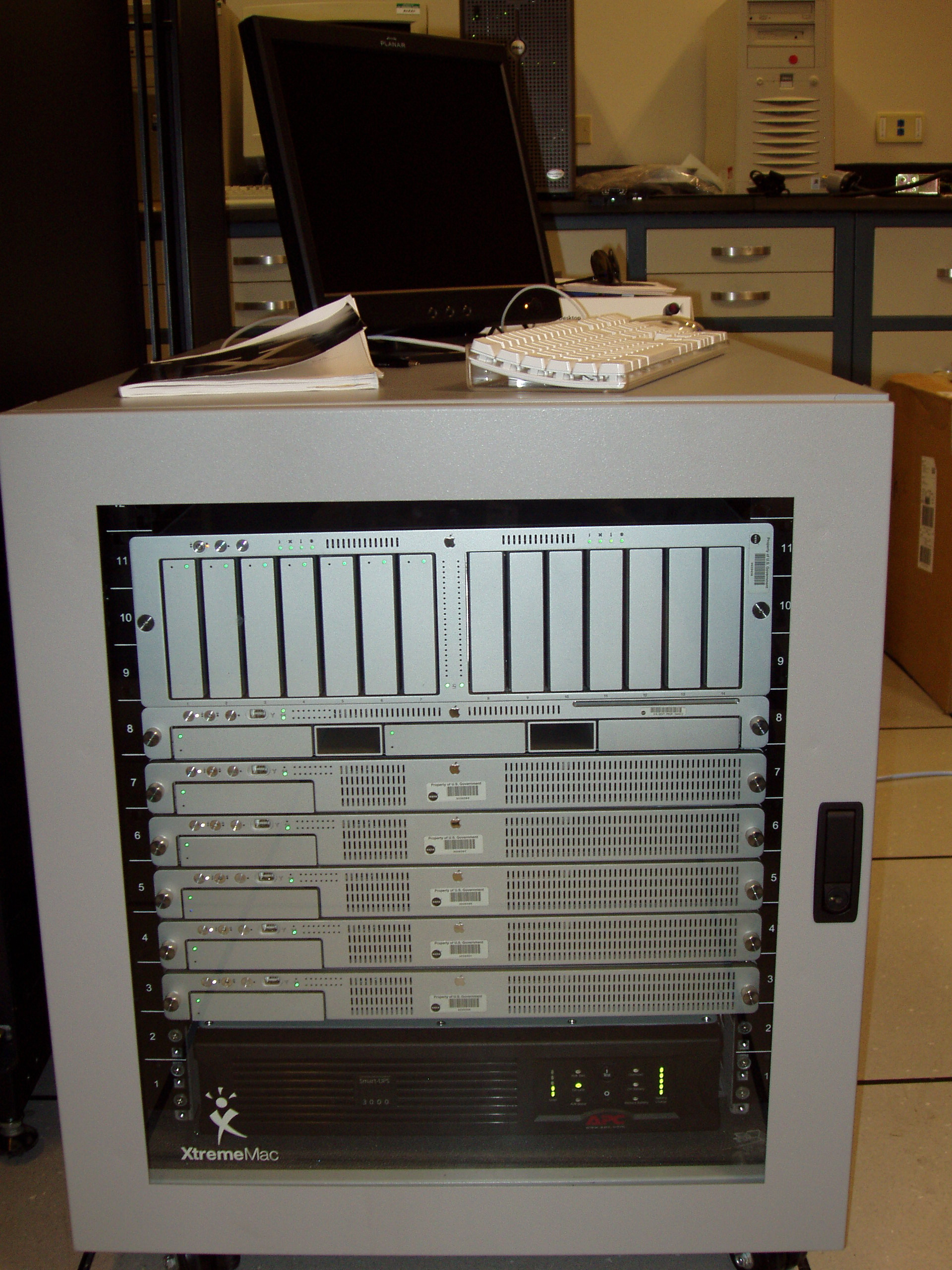
A small Xserve cluster with an Xserve RAID and APC UPS

The Xserve is a discontinued series of rack-mounted servers that was manufactured by Apple Inc. between 2002 and 2011. It was Apple's first rack-mounted server, and could function as a file server, web server or run high-performance computing applications in clusters – a dedicated cluster Xserve, the Xserve Cluster Node, without a video card and optical drives was also available. The first Xserve had a PowerPC G4 processor, replaced by a PowerPC G5 in 2004, and by Intel Xeon processors in 2006; each was available in single-processor and dual-processor configurations. The Xserve was discontinued in 2011, and replaced with the Mac Pro Server and the Mac Mini Server.

Before the Xserve, Apple's server line included the Apple Workgroup Server, Macintosh Server, and Apple Network Server.

== Xserve G4 ==
Xserve G4
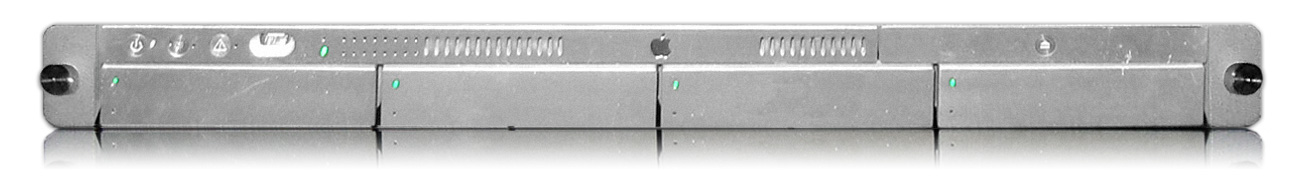
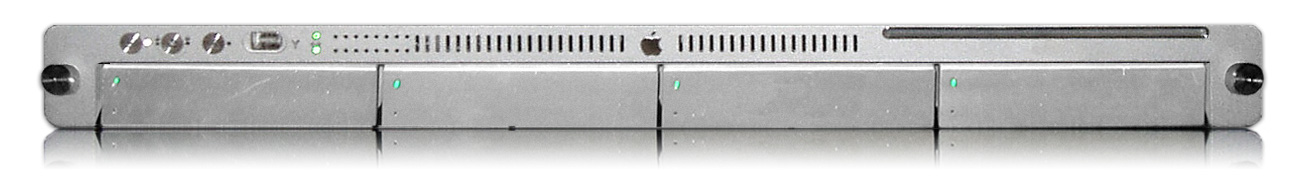
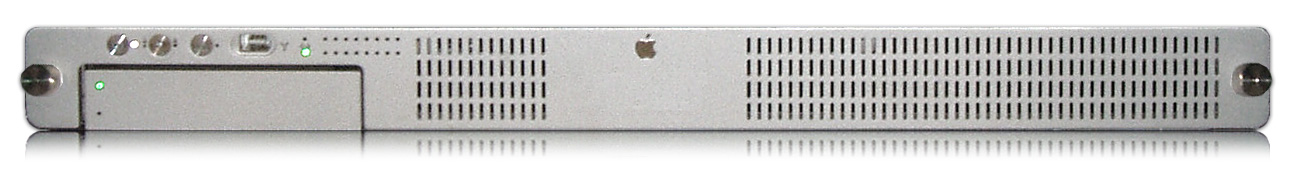
- The original Xserve G4 The second-generation Xserve G4 The Xserve G4 Cluster Node
- Developer: Apple Inc.
- Type: Rackmounted Server
- Released: May 14, 2002
- Discontinued: January 6, 2004
- CPU: Single or dual PowerPC G4, 1 GHz – 1.33 GHz
- Predecessor: Apple Workgroup Server and Macintosh Server; Apple Network Server

Apple introduced the Xserve on May 14, 2002 (released in June). Initially, two configuration options were available: a single-processor Xserve at US$2999, and a dual-processor Xserve at US$3999. Xserves sold before August 24, 2002 shipped with Mac OS X v10.1 "Puma" Server, while those sold after shipped with Mac OS X v10.2 "Jaguar" Server.

On February 10, 2003, Apple released an improved and expanded Xserve lineup. Improvements included one or two 1.33 GHz PowerPC G4 processors, faster memory, and higher capacity Ultra ATA/133 hard disk drives. The front plate was redesigned for a slot-loading optical drive. A new model, the Xserve Cluster node was announced at the same price as the single-processor Xserve, featuring two 1.33 GHz processors, no optical drive, a single hard drive bay, no video or Ethernet cards, and a 10-client version of "Jaguar" server.

On April 2, 2003 the Xserve RAID was introduced, providing a much higher capacity and higher throughput disk subsystem for the Xserve.

According to Apple, all of these models are obsolete. (Note: Apple products that have been discontinued for 7 years and no longer receive hardware support or spare parts)

Component	Xserve G4	Xserve G4 (Slot Load)	Xserve G4 Cluster Node
Model identifier	RackMac1,1	RackMac1,2	
Processor	1 GHz or Dual 1 GHz	1.33 GHz or Dual 1.33 GHz	Dual 1.33 GHz
CPU cache	64 KB L1, 256 KB (1:1) L2, 2 MB L3 (Per Processor)		
Front side bus	133 MHz	167 MHz	
Memory	256 MB of PC2100 DDR SDRAM (1 GHz); 512 MB of PC2100 DDR SDRAM (DP 1 GHz); Expandable to 2 GB	256 MB of PC2700 DDR SDRAM (1.33 GHz); 512 MB of PC2700 DDR SDRAM (DP 1.33 GHz); Expandable to 2 GB	256 MB of PC2700 DDR SDRAM; Expandable to 2 GB
Graphics	ATI PCI Graphics with 32 MB of DDR SDRAM; Optional ATI Radeon 8500 (AGP 4x)	ATI PCI Graphics with 32 MB of DDR SDRAM; Optional AGP 4x card with 64 MB of DDR SDRAM	None
Hard drive	60 or 120 GB 7200-rpm ATA; Up to 4x 120 GB (480 GB)	60 GB 7200-rpm ATA; Up to 4x 180 GB (720 GB)	60 GB 7200-rpm ATA
Hard drive	Ultra ATA/100 (Optional Ultra 160 SCSI); Four Internal Bays	Ultra ATA/133; Four Internal Bays	Ultra ATA/133
Optical drive	CD-ROM; Tray-loading	CD-ROM or CD-RW/DVD-ROM Combo Drive; Slot-loading	None
Connectivity	2x Gigabit Ethernet (One on PCI card)		1x Gigabit Ethernet
Expansion	2x 64-bit 66 MHz PCI slots 1x 66 MHz PCI/AGP slot (used for Gigabit Ethernet card)		2x 64-bit 66 MHz PCI slots
Peripherals	2x USB 1.1; 3x FireWire 400; 1x RS-232 serial	2x USB 1.1; 1x FireWire 400; 2x FireWire 800; 1x RS-232 serial	
Video out	VGA	VGA or (VGA, DVI and S-Video) with AGP 4x card	None
Minimum operating system	Mac OS X Server 10.1.5 Puma	Mac OS X Server 10.2.4 Jaguar	
Latest release operating system	Mac OS X Server 10.5.8 Leopard		
Weight	11.8 kg (26 Pounds)		

== Xserve G5 ==
Xserve G5
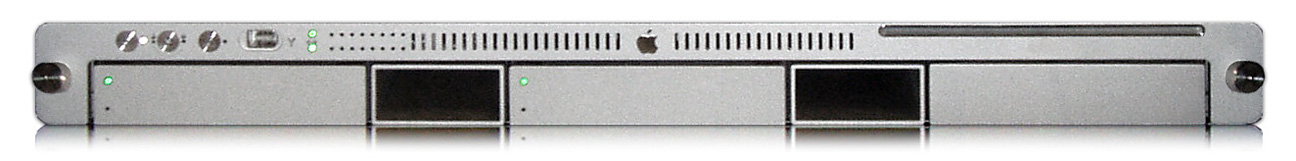
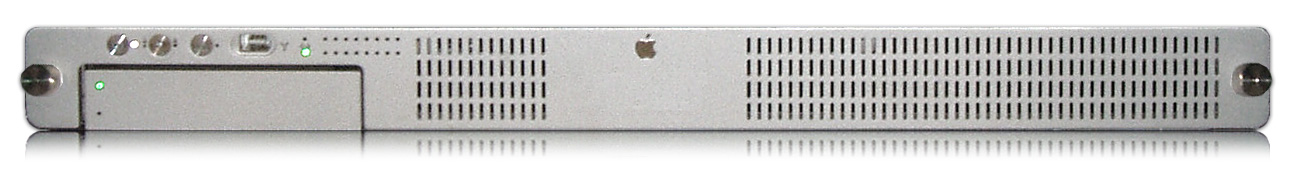
- The Xserve G5 The Xserve G5 Cluster Node
- Developer: Apple Inc.
- Type: Rackmounted Server
- Released: January 6, 2004
- Discontinued: November 2006
- CPU: Single or dual PowerPC G5, 2 GHz – 2.3 GHz

On January 6, 2004 Apple introduced the Xserve G5, a redesigned higher-performance Xserve. The 32-bit PowerPC G4s were replaced with one or two 64-bit PowerPC 970 processors running at 2 GHz. Ventilation issues restricted it to three SATA hot-swap drive bays, with the original space for the fourth drive bay used for air vents. The front plate and slot-loading optical drive were retained from the last Xserve G4. The higher memory capacity and bandwidth as well as the stronger floating-point performance of the PowerPC 970 made it more suitable for high-performance computing (HPC) applications. System X is one such cluster computer built with Xserves.

Three configuration options were available: a single-processor model at US$2,999, a dual-processor model at $3,999, and a dual-processor cluster node model (with an unchanged appearance from the G4 cluster node) at US$2,999.

On January 3, 2005, Apple updated the Xserve G5 with faster processors in the dual-processor configurations. 400 GB hard disks were made available for up to 1.2 TB of internal storage. The slot-loading optical drive was upgraded to a combination DVD-ROM/CD-RW standard, DVD-/+RW optional. Soon after, Apple updated the Xserve and Xserve RAID to allow the use of 500 GB Hard Drives.

Xserve G5 models before April 2005 shipped with Mac OS X v10.3 "Panther", after April 2005 shipped with Mac OS X v10.4 "Tiger".

According to Apple, all of these models are obsolete.

Component	Xserve G5	Xserve G5 Cluster Node
Order Number(s)	ML/9216A (2.0), ML/9217A (2.0 DP), M9745LL/A (2.3)	ML/9215A (2.0), M9742LL/A (2.3)
Model identifier	RackMac3.1	
Processor	2 GHz, Dual 2 GHz, or Dual 2.3 GHz; PowerPC 970FX	Dual 2 GHz or Dual 2.3 GHz; PowerPC 970FX
CPU cache	512 KB L2	
Front side bus	1 GHz (2.0 GHz SP or DP); 1.15 GHz (2.3 GHz DP)	
Memory	512 MB or 1 GB of 400 MHz PC3200 ECC DDR SDRAM; Expandable to 16 GB	512 MB of 400 MHz PC3200 ECC DDR SDRAM; Expandable to 16 GB
Graphics	None; Optional PCI card	
Hard drive	80 GB; Up to 3x 500 GB (1.5 TB)	
Hard drive	Serial ATA 7200-rpm Three Internal Bays	
Optical drive	CD-ROM, CD-RW/DVD-ROM Combo Drive or DVD-RW SuperDrive; Slot-loading	None
Connectivity	2x Gigabit Ethernet	
Expansion	2x 64-bit PCI-X slots	
Peripherals	2x USB 2.0; 2x FireWire 800; 1x FireWire 400; 1x RS-232 serial	
Video out	None (VGA with optional PCI card)	
Minimum operating system	Mac OS X Server 10.3 Panther	
Latest release operating system	Mac OS X Server 10.5.8 Leopard	
Weight	15.1 kg (33 Pounds)	

== Intel Xserve ==
Xserve "Xeon"
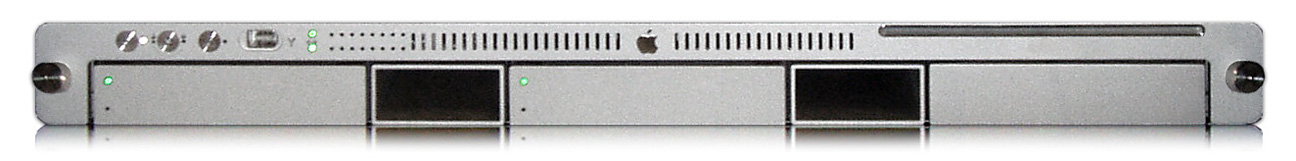
- The Intel Xserve
- Developer: Apple Inc.
- Type: Rackmounted Server
- Released: 2007
- Discontinued: January 31, 2011
- CPU: Single or Dual Intel Xeon Dual or Quad Core CPUs, 2.0 GHz – 3.33 GHz
- Successor: Mac Pro Server; Mac Mini Server
- Website: apple.com/xserve

The Intel-based Xserves were announced at the Worldwide Developers Conference on August 7, 2006, and are significantly faster compared to the Xserve G5. They use Intel Xeon ('Woodcrest') processors, DDR2 ECC FB-DIMMs, ATI Radeon graphics, a maximum storage capacity of 2.25 TB when used with three 750 GB drives, optional redundant power supplies and a 1U rack form factor. The Intel Xserves now had on board video, freeing up an expansion slot.

On January 8, 2008 Xserve was updated with Intel Xeon ('Harpertown') processors, faster memory, and a maximum storage capacity of 3 TB when used with three 1 TB drives. The front-mounted FireWire 400 port featured in previous models was also replaced with a USB 2.0 port. The Xserve RAID was discontinued on February 19, 2008.

On April 7, 2009 Xserve was updated to use Intel Xeon ('Gainestown') processors, DDR3 memory, and NVIDIA graphics with Mini DisplayPort output. The update also saw an increase to the maximum storage capacity, bringing it to 6 TB when used with three 2 TB drives. An option to add a SSD boot-drive that does not occupy a drive bay was also implemented. The addition of the SSD boot drive allows all drives to be swapped whilst the server remains online. It is also Apple's first Xserve to use PVC-free internal cables and components and contain no brominated flame retardants.

On August 28, 2009 Xserve was updated to ship standard with Mac OS X Server 10.6 Unlimited Client Server. In addition to improved functionality Mac OS X 10.6 Server added support for up to 96 GB of RAM.

On November 5, 2010, Apple announced that it would not be developing a future version of Xserve. While accepting orders for the current model until January 31, 2011, and "honoring" all Xserve warranties and extended support programs, the company suggested users switch to Mac Pro Server or Mac Mini Server.

After the Xserve's discontinuation, an annoyed customer emailed Steve Jobs, who responded that "hardly anyone was buying them".

According to Apple, all of these models are obsolete.

Component	Late 2006	Early 2008	Early 2009
Release date	August 7, 2006	January 8, 2008	April 7, 2009
Model identifier	Xserve1,1	Xserve2,1	Xserve3,1
Processor	Dual 2 GHz, Dual 2.66 GHz, or Dual 3 GHz; Dual-Core Intel Xeon 5100 ("Woodcrest")	2.8 GHz, Dual 2.8 GHz, or Dual 3 GHz; Quad-Core Intel Xeon 5400 ("Harpertown")	2.26 GHz, Dual 2.26 GHz, Dual 2.66 GHz, or Dual 2.93 GHz; Quad-Core Intel Xeon 5500 ("Gainestown")
CPU cache	4 MB L2 (Per Processor)	12 MB L2 (Per Processor)	4x 256 KB L2; 8 MB L3 (Per Processor)
System bus	1333 MHz Front side bus (Per Processor)	1600 MHz Front side bus (Per Processor)	QPI
Memory	1 GB of 667 MHz PC2-5300 Fully Buffered ECC DDR2 SDRAM; Expandable to 32 GB	2 GB of 800 MHz PC2-6400 Fully Buffered ECC DDR2 SDRAM; Expandable to 32 GB	3 GB of 1066 MHz PC3-8500 ECC DDR3 SDRAM; Expandable to 24 GB (Quad Core) or 48 GB (Eight Core)
Graphics	ATI Radeon X1300 with 64 MB of GDDR3 SDRAM; Optional ATI Radeon X1300 with 256 MB of DDR2 SDRAM	ATI Radeon X1300 with 64 MB of GDDR3 SDRAM	NVIDIA GeForce GT 120 with 256 MB of GDDR3 SDRAM
Hard drive	80 GB SATA; SATA: Up to 3x 750 GB (2.25 TB); SAS: Up to 3x 300 GB (900 GB)	80 GB SATA; SATA: Up to 3x 1 TB (3 TB); SAS: Up to 3x 450 GB (1.35 TB)	160 GB SATA; SATA: Up to 3x 2 TB (6 TB); SAS: Up to 3x 450 GB (1.35 TB)
Hard drive	Serial ATA 5400-rpm or SAS 15000-rpm Three Internal Bays		Serial ATA 7200-rpm or SAS 15000-rpm Optional 128 GB SSD Boot Drive; Three Internal Bays
Optical drive Slot loading	CD-RW/DVD-ROM Combo Drive or DVD-RW DL SuperDrive	DVD-RW DL SuperDrive	
Connectivity	2x Gigabit Ethernet		
Expansion	1x PCIe ×8; 1x configurable slot (PCIe ×8 or 133 MHz PCI-X)	1x PCIe 2.0 ×16; 1x configurable slot (PCIe 2.0 ×8 or 133 MHz PCI-X)	2x PCIe 2.0 ×16 (1x 6.6" length and 1x 9.25" length)
Peripherals	2x USB 2.0; 2x FireWire 800; 1x FireWire 400; 1x RS-232 serial	3x USB 2.0; 2x FireWire 800; 1x RS-232 serial	
Video out	Mini-DVI (VGA with adapter); Dual-Link DVI with optional ATI video card		Mini DisplayPort
Minimum operating system	Mac OS X 10.4 Tiger	Mac OS X 10.5 Leopard	
Latest release operating system	Mac OS X 10.7 Lion & Mac OS X Server		OS X 10.11 El Capitan & macOS Server
Weight	14.4 kg (31.7 Pounds)		14 kg (30.86 Pounds)

== Supported operating systems ==
macOS release	Xserve G4		Xserve G5	Xserve Xeon		
macOS release	Original	Slot Load/Cluster Node	All	Late 2006	Early 2008	Early 2009
macOS release	RackMac1,1	RackMac1,2	RackMac3,1	Xserve1,1	Xserve2,1	Xserve3,1
10.1 Puma Server	10.1.5	No	No	No	No	No
10.2 Jaguar Server	Yes	10.2.4	No	No	No	No
10.3 Panther Server	Yes	Yes	Yes	No	No	No
10.4 Tiger Server	Yes	Yes	Yes	10.4.8	No	No
10.5 Leopard Server	Yes	Yes	Yes	Yes	Yes	Yes
10.6 Snow Leopard Server	No	No	No	Yes	Yes	Yes
10.7 Lion and Mac OS X Server	No	No	No	Yes	Yes	Yes
10.8 Mountain Lion and OS X Server	No	No	No	patch	patch	Yes
10.9 Mavericks and OS X Server	No	No	No	patch	patch	Yes
10.10 Yosemite and OS X Server	No	No	No	patch, upgraded GPU	patch, upgraded GPU	Yes
10.11 El Capitan and OS X Server	No	No	No	patch, upgraded GPU	patch, upgraded GPU	Yes
10.12 Sierra and macOS Server	No	No	No	No	patch, upgraded GPU	patch
10.13 High Sierra and macOS Server	No	No	No	No	patch, upgraded GPU	patch
10.14 Mojave and macOS Server	No	No	No	No	patch, upgraded GPU	patch
10.15 Catalina and macOS Server	No	No	No	No	patch, upgraded GPU	patch
11 Big Sur and macOS Server	No	No	No	No	patch, upgraded GPU	patch
12 Monterey and macOS Server	No	No	No	No	patch, upgraded GPU	patch
13 Ventura	No	No	No	No	patch, upgraded GPU	patch
14 Sonoma	No	No	No	No	patch, upgraded GPU	patch
15 Sequoia	No	No	No	No	patch, upgraded GPU	patch
26 Tahoe	No	No	No	No	patch, upgraded GPU	patch
27 Golden Gate	No	No	No	No	No	No

Timeline of Macintosh servers
See also: List of Mac models
