= Apple silicon Mac =

Apple silicon Mac are Mac computers using Apple silicon processor.

Apple silicon Mac may refer to:

- iMac (Apple silicon)
- MacBook Air (Apple silicon)
- MacBook Pro (Apple silicon)
- Mac Studio
- Mac Mini (Apple silicon)
- Mac Pro (Apple silicon)
