= Apple Battery Charger =

Battery charger by Apple

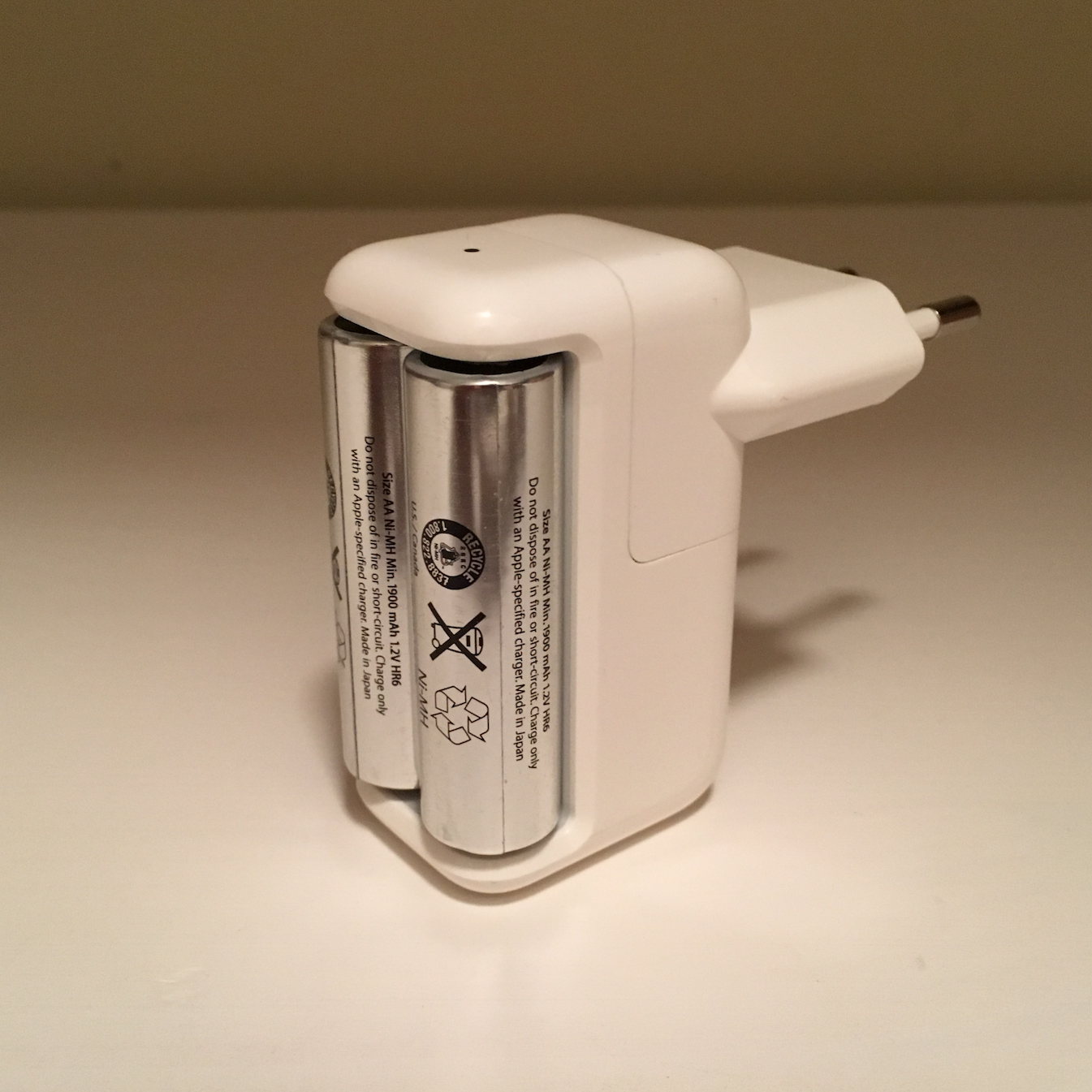
- A European Apple Battery Charger
- Also known as: A1360
- Developer: Apple Inc.
- Type: Battery Charger
- Released: July 27, 2010
- Discontinued: 2016
- Website: Homepage at the Wayback Machine (archived 2016-01-25)

The Apple Battery Charger is a battery charger which was sold by Apple Inc. and bundled with six AA batteries. It was introduced in July 2010 and marketed as a way to charge Apple's wireless Magic Mouse, Magic Trackpad and Apple Wireless Keyboard. The charger was discontinued around 2016, after Apple revised their peripherals with built-in batteries that can be charged with a Lightning connector.

== Charger ==
The charger has a white design, with a small indicator light on top that glows amber while the batteries are charging, and green once they are charged. It can charge two NiMH batteries at once, and takes five hours for a full charge.

Apple's main marketing claim for the product was that the charger had a standby power draw of 30 mW, compared to an industry average of 315 mW.

== Batteries ==
The charger was sold with six rechargeable AA batteries that use low self-discharge NiMH technology, have a silver design and no Apple branding, and have an advertised capacity of 1,900 milliampere-hour (mAh). Czech website SuperApple identified the batteries as likely being rebranded Eneloop HR-3UTG 1.2 volt batteries manufactured by Sanyo.

According to Apple, these batteries were designed to have a service life of up to ten years and retain 80% of their capacity even after being stored for a year. Engadget says the Sanyo Eneloop batteries are able to retain 75% of their charge after three years.

== Reception ==
Engadget criticized Apple for selling their charger and six batteries for $29 when Sanyo sold a charger and eight batteries for the same price. SuperApple noted that Apple's then-current wireless peripherals used two AA batteries, but older Apple Wireless Keyboards used three; Apple's charger could only charge two at once.

Apple marketed its battery charger as environmentally friendly due to a lower standby power draw, although Massachusetts Institute of Technology engineering professor Gerbrand Ceder criticized Apple for shipping peripherals that require disposable batteries, instead of non-removable lithium-ion batteries like many of Apple's competitors.

== See also ==
- Rechargeable battery
- Magic Mouse
- Apple Wireless Keyboard
