= AppleCare =

Apple's warranty plan

AppleCare is Apple's line of extended warranty and technical support plans. It allows the customer unlimited incidents of accidental damage with a deductible (which, like the price of the plan, varies by device). AppleCare is available for Mac, iPad, iPhone, Apple Watch, Apple Vision Pro, Apple Display, headphones, Apple TV and HomePod. AppleCare plans include Apple software associated with the covered hardware.

Most Apple hardware comes with complimentary telephone technical support and a limited warranty from Apple. In the United States, AppleCare+ with Theft and Loss runs alongside the warranty from the purchase date, and provides one-stop service and support from Apple experts. Customers can elect to continue their AppleCare coverage on an annual basis upon the expiration of their initial plan. The monthly option will run until canceled.

AppleCare+ is sold by Apple and its authorized resellers. It can be attached via the serial number to devices purchased online, up to thirty or sixty days post-purchase. In 2025, Apple removed the option to make an upfront payment for extended warranty at retail locations.

AppleCare also includes an express replacement service for iPad and iPhone. AppleCare insures against accidental damage, unlike the statutory warranty.

AppleCare services may be provided in all countries where the program is offered regardless of country of AppleCare purchase, subject to local terms and conditions.

AppleCare+ does not override any existing warranty laws or consumer rights laws.

As of August 2025, AppleCare+ with Theft and Loss coverage is provided in Australia, Austria, Chile, Denmark, Finland, France, Germany, Italy, Ireland, Japan, the Netherlands, New Zealand, Norway, Spain, Sweden, Switzerland, United Kingdom and the United States. AppleCare+ with Theft and Loss includes up to two incidents of accidental damage, theft or loss coverage at a reduced cost to the end consumer. Currently, Theft and Loss coverage is unavailable in some parts of Europe, South America, Asia Pacific, Africa, North America (Canada) or Antarctica. To be able to claim on a stolen or lost device, the customer's Find My feature needs to be active.

On July 23, 2025, Apple introduced AppleCare One, a bundled warranty service that allows customers to cover three Apple products under a single monthly plan, while having the ability to add more than three devices with a discounted price as well as theft and loss coverage for iPhones, iPads, and Apple Watches. Unlike AppleCare+, which users have to enroll within 60 days of purchasing the device, users are able to add devices that are under four years old, given that the devices are in good condition. On September 13, 2026. Apple introduced AppleCare One Family, which covers all the devices in a Family Sharing group with the same benefits as the individual plan.

== Included iPad and Mac accessory coverage ==
As of May 2026 AppleCare plans for iPads and Macs include coverage for certain related accessories. Customers who purchase AppleCare+ with any iPad are automatically entitled to receive coverage for some other related Apple accessories and in-box accessories (such as power adapters and cables). AppleCare+ for iPad also covers accidental damage for a single Apple Pencil or Magic Keyboard.

Customers who purchase AppleCare with any Mac or Apple-branded display are entitled to receive coverage for numerous accessories in the original packaging, including but not limited to Apple-branded mice, track pads, keyboards, and VESA mounts.

== AppleCare+ Extended Service ==
In some countries or territories where there are no local Apple offices, such as parts of Latin America, the "AppleCare+ Extended Service" product is available in place of the AppleCare+ product. This offers the same hardware warranty, but without phone and online support.

== Compliance in various jurisdictions ==
=== China ===
On March 15, 2013, China Central Television aired a program for the World Consumer Rights Day. The program criticized the issue associated with Apple warranty issues in China. The report said, an iPhone always gets an old back cover when being repaired in China. It also states that the warranty period for changed product is only 90 days and the warranty period for Macintosh and iPad are not according to Chinese laws to get warranty in China. On April 1, 2013, Apple CEO Tim Cook apologized to Chinese consumers for the China warranty policy and changed the policy.

=== European Union ===
In some parts of European countries a part of the European Union (EU), local regulations gives consumers a minimum of two years warranty on hardware defects that existed at time of purchase, which overlaps the benefits of AppleCare. This effectively means that, in certain countries in the EU, AppleCare+ still offers phone and online support for ninety days on all devices. In most countries, the onus under the EU law is on the merchant to establish that a hardware defect did not exist at time of purchase for the first six months after purchase. After the six-month period, this is reversed, meaning that the customer may need to establish that a hardware defect did exist when they received the product. Unlike the statutory guarantee, AppleCare+ also covers defects that appeared after purchase, if the device was handled correctly.

==== Italy ====
On December 27, 2011, Apple was fined a total of €900,000 by the Italian Antitrust Authority for failing to properly inform customers of their legal right to two years of warranty service under Italy's Consumer Code. According to the Italian agency Apple only disclosed its own standard one-year warranty and offered to sell customers AppleCare+ for one additional year instead of abiding by the law. The agency fined Apple €400,000 for failing to disclose the legally mandated two-year warranty and €500,000 for selling overlapping AppleCare+ coverage.
