= MOBILedit =

Digital forensics and consumer phone management company

MOBILedit Forensic is a digital forensics product by Compelson Labs that searches, examines and report on data from GSM/CDMA/PCS cell phone devices. MOBILedit connects to cell phone devices via an Infrared (IR) port, a Bluetooth link, Wi-Fi, or a cable interface. After connectivity has been established, the phone model is identified by its manufacturer, model number, and serial number (IMEI) and with a corresponding picture of the phone.

Data acquired from cell phone devices are stored in the .med file format. After a successful logical acquisition, the following fields are populated with data: subscriber information, device specifics, Phonebook, SIM Phonebook, Missed Calls, Last Numbers Dialed, Received Calls, Inbox, Sent Items, Drafts, Files folder. Items present in the Files folder, ranging from Graphics files to Camera Photos and Tones, depend on the phone's capabilities. Additional features include the myPhoneSafe.com service, which provides access to the IMEI database to register and check for stolen phones.

MOBILedit is a platform that works with a variety of phones and smartphones (a complete list of supported handsets is available on the manufacturer's website) and explores contents of the phone through a MS Outlook-like folder structure. This allows backup of the information stored on the phone, storing it on a PC or copy data to another phone via Phone Copier feature.

== See also ==
- iMazing
- Cellebrite
