= Apple Mighty Mouse =

First multi-button mouse produced by Apple Inc.

Mighty Mouse / Apple Mouse
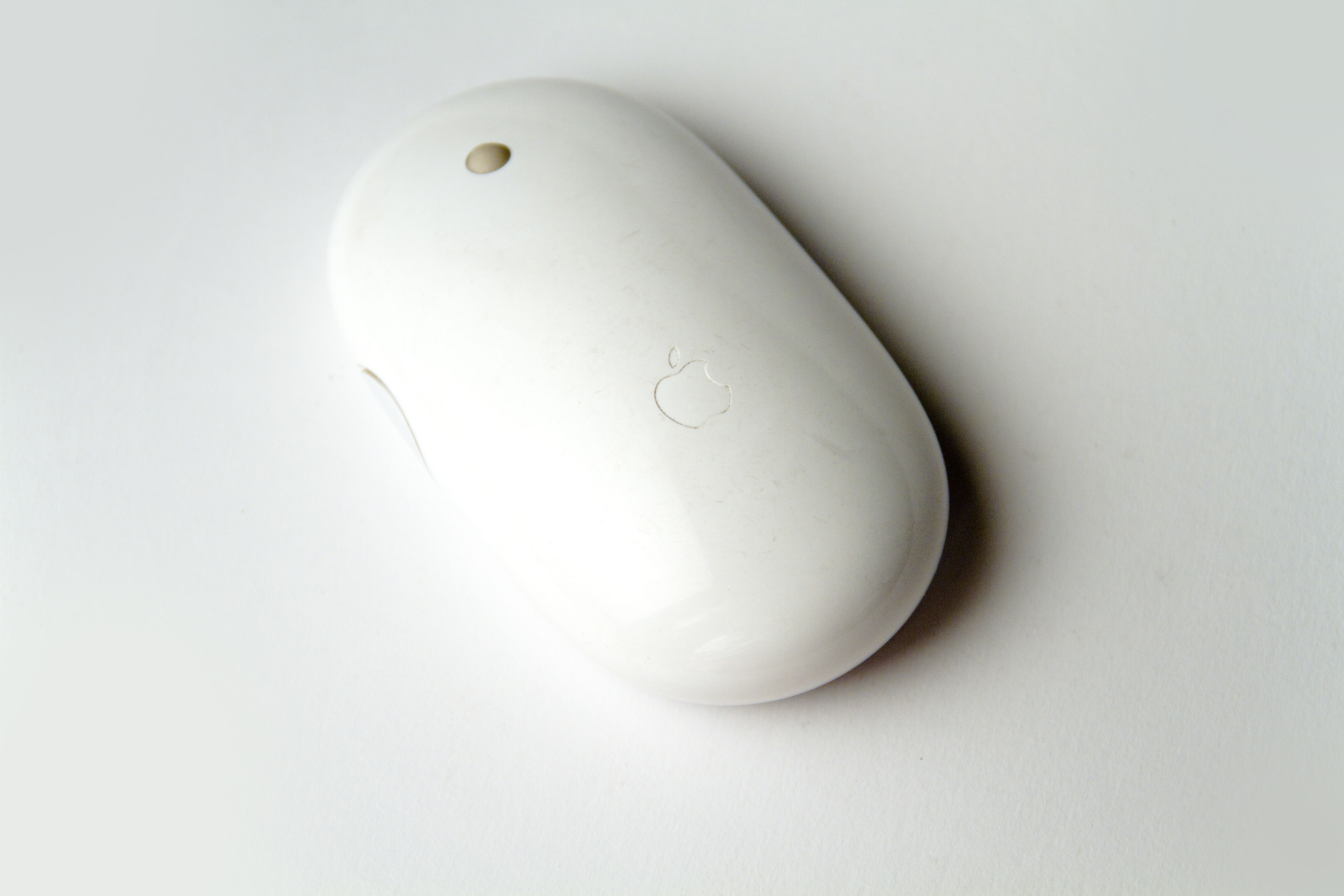
- Apple Mighty Mouse (wireless version shown)
- Manufacturer: Apple
- Type: Mouse with integral trackball
- Released: August 2, 2005
- Discontinued: October 20, 2009 (wireless); June 5, 2017 (wired)
- Connectivity: USB (wired); Bluetooth (wireless)
- Power: USB (wired); Either 1 or 2 AA (wireless)
- Predecessor: Apple Wireless Mouse; Apple Pro Mouse
- Successor: Apple Magic Mouse
- Related: Apple Keyboard; Apple Wireless Keyboard

The Apple Mouse (A1152) (formerly Mighty Mouse) is a multi-control USB mouse manufactured by Mitsumi Electric and sold by Apple Inc. It was announced and sold for the first time on August 2, 2005, and a Bluetooth version was available from 2006 to 2009. Before the Mighty Mouse, Apple had sold only one-button mice with its computers, beginning with the Apple Lisa 22 years earlier. The Mighty Mouse supported two buttons, and a miniature trackball for scrolling.

On October 20, 2009, the wireless Mighty Mouse was discontinued and replaced by the multi-touch Magic Mouse. The wired version of the device remained available, but was renamed the Apple Mouse, due to trademark issues with another manufacturer of a device named Mighty Mouse. As of June 5, 2017, the Apple Mouse is no longer available to buy on Apple's website.

== Design ==
The Mighty Mouse is made of white plastic and has a recessed Apple logo on the mouse's face. The mouse has four functional controls: a left capacitive sensor, a right capacitive sensor, a trackball with a pressure sensor and side squeeze sensors. The track ball enables users to scroll a page or document in any direction, including diagonally. Instead of mechanical buttons, the touch-sensitive topshell (mentioned below) and the pressure-sensing trackball allow the mouse to detect which side is being touched or whether the trackball is being held in.

The mouse emits a faint clicking sound when the scroll ball is rolled or the side squeeze sensors are depressed, but this is not directly caused by the ball moving or side buttons being pressed; the sound is actually produced by a tiny speaker inside the mouse. There is no way to disable this feature other than physically disabling the speaker inside the mouse.

Currently, Mac OS X is the only operating system that fully supports the mouse without third-party software. When used with Mac OS X, the sensors can be set to launch applications or trigger features of the Apple operating system, such as Dashboard and Exposé. If not used with Mac OS X, the mouse behaves as a four "button" mouse with a vertical and horizontal scroll wheel. There are third-party drivers (including XMouse) that provide more functions to users of other platforms such as Windows.

The Mighty Mouse does not report whether the right and left sensors are activated simultaneously. It reports a right-click only when there is no finger contact on the left side of the mouse. Thus a right-click requires lifting the finger off the mouse, then right-clicking. This also means that the Mighty Mouse cannot support mouse chording, used by CAD software, games, and other applications where multiple functions are mapped to the mouse.

== Technical features ==
- Touch-sensitive top shell
- Trackball
- Force-sensing side "squeeze" areas
- Optical (LED) tracking (wired version)
- Laser tracking (wireless version)
- Compatible with Macintosh, Windows, and Linux PCs
- Programmable functions for the four "buttons"
- Auditory feedback with built-in speaker

== Criticism ==
A frequent criticism of the Mighty Mouse was that, although it can sense both right and left clicks, it is not possible to press both sensors simultaneously. This requires lifting the left finger off the sensor surface before attempting a right-mouse click. Furthermore, the scroll ball eventually becomes clogged with dirt, requiring cleaning. While there are methods to clean the ball without dismantling the mouse, it is still a difficult process, which has drawn criticism from many users.

== Name ==
Prior to launching the device, Apple received a license to the name "Mighty Mouse" from Viacom, and subsequently CBS Operations, as owner of the Mighty Mouse cartoon series, the title having been registered in the US as a trademark with respect to various merchandise (such as T-shirts and multivitamins) associated with the character. However, the trademark did not cover computer peripherals, and CBS did not apply to trademark the term in the US with respect to computer mice until mid-2007.

On May 21, 2008, it was announced that Man & Machine Inc., a supplier of keyboards and mice to laboratories and hospitals, had sued Apple Inc. for trademark infringement over its use of the name Mighty Mouse. Man & Machine Inc. had four registered or pending trademarks on various computer pointing related technologies, including "Cool Mouse", "Really Cool", and "Man and Machine and Design". The particular Mighty Mouse trademark in dispute was first filed by Man & Machine Inc., on December 18, 2007, with the description "Computer cursor control devices, namely, computer mice"—after CBS's filing, but claiming first use in 2004, before the introduction of the Apple device. There also was another scroll mouse named Mighty Mouse developed by NTT and ETH Zürich in 1985.

Following opposition proceedings on both sides against the other, CBS subsequently withdrew its application, allowing Man & Machine to register the US trademark for computer mice. As a result, Apple stopped selling mice under the "Mighty Mouse" name on October 20, 2009, when it introduced the wireless Magic Mouse and renamed the existing wired mouse the "Apple Mouse".

Incidentally, CBS was successful in registering "Mighty Mouse" as a trademark for computer mice in some other countries, including Canada, although Apple nevertheless chose to change its product name internationally.

== See also ==
- Apple Mouse
- Apple keyboards
- Magic Mouse
