= IMac Pro =

Desktop computer by Apple

iMac Pro
- Developer: Apple
- Product family: iMac; Macintosh
- Type: All-in-one; Workstation
- Released: December 14, 2017
- Discontinued: March 19, 2021
- Operating system: macOS (High Sierra through Sequoia), Windows 10
- CPU: Intel Xeon W
- Successor: Mac Studio

The iMac Pro is an all-in-one personal computer and workstation sold by Apple from 2017 to 2021. At its release, it was one of four desktop computers in the Macintosh lineup, sitting above the consumer range Mac Mini and iMac, and serving as an all-in-one alternative to the Mac Pro. After the cylindrical Mac Pro redesign went years without any update, Apple hosted a roundtable with journalists promising a redesign and commitment to professional Mac computers; the iMac Pro was introduced in the interim before the revised Mac Pro shipped in 2019.

Externally, the iMac Pro is nearly identical to the consumer iMac, albeit in a darker finish. Apple redesigned the internals to provide cooling for workstation Intel Xeon processors and AMD Vega graphics. The iMac Pro was positively received by critics, who praised its quiet performance and appeal as an all-in-one machine, while criticizing its lack of expansion and upgradability, as well as the drawbacks it retained from the regular iMac. After receiving only minor updates, the machine was discontinued in March 2021, and was replaced by the revised Mac Pro and the Mac Studio.

== Background ==
In 2013, Apple replaced its tower Mac Pro workstation computer with a radically redesigned cylindrical model. The 2013 Mac Pro was sold for years without any updates, and Apple later said that its small design and focus on dual graphics processing units (GPU) had been a mistake. In April 2017, Apple convened a roundtable of journalists and executives to restate their commitment to professional Macs. As part of the announcement, Apple said a new monitor and Mac Pro were being developed but would not arrive that year. In June, Apple announced the iMac Pro to fill the gap.

== Overview ==
The iMac Pro is an all-in-one workstation computer. It uses nearly the same chassis design as the 27-inch iMac that it was sold alongside, having the same screen, exterior dimensions, and stand. The iMac Pro comes in a darker "space gray" finish, with a color-matched Magic Keyboard, Magic Mouse and Magic Trackpad. The iMac Pro also has more connectivity options than the iMac, with four Thunderbolt 3 ports, four Universal Serial Bus (USB-A) ports, a headphone jack, and an SDXC card slot. The iMac Pro was the first Mac to ship with a 10 Gigabit Ethernet port, which can switch between speeds based on the connected network. The iMac Pro has IEEE 802.11ac Wi-Fi and Bluetooth 5.0 wireless networking built in.

Internally, the iMac Pro has a substantially different arrangement than the regular iMac. The space for a 3.5-inch hard drive has been removed, being replaced with a larger cooling system for the processor. The iMac Pro uses Intel Xeon-W processors. It was the first Mac equipped with Apple's T2 chip, a custom Apple coprocessor that performs tasks, including the system management and storage controllers, previously performed by a number of different chips. It also encrypts the iMac Pro's storage, and has an image signal processor. Other changes from the regular iMac include a webcam that records at higher resolutions (1080p), additional microphones for better sound quality, and larger speakers.

Unlike the 27-inch iMac, the iMac Pro does not have a memory access hatch on the back, and upgrades require disassembling the computer. The processor is likewise socketed for upgrades, although the graphics processing unit (GPU) is soldered to the motherboard. The solid-state drive (SSD) is user-replaceable, but requires disassembly of the iMac Pro and an Apple Configurator restore after the new storage modules are installed. The iMac Pro's stand is user-replaceable with a licensed OEM VESA mount kit sold by Apple. The mount uses zinc screws that may be prone to breaking.

== Release ==
The iMac Pro was announced at the Worldwide Developers Conference (WWDC) on June 5, 2017, and was released on December 14, 2017. Apple billed it as "the most powerful Mac ever made". The computer shipped in a base configuration of an 8-core Xeon processor, AMD Vega 56 GPU, 32 GB of ECC memory, and a 1 TB SSD. It could be configured to an 18-core Xeon processor (sacrificing per-core clock speed for more multiprocessing power,) AMD Vega 64 graphics, 128 GB of memory, and a 2 TB SSD. Unlike other Apple computers of the time, each component upgrade was available a la carte, rather than some upgrades being tied to higher-priced configurations.

The iMac Pro received only minor updates after release. The configuration options were updated on March 19, 2019, adding a 256 GB memory and AMD Vega 64X graphics option. Apple discontinued the 8-core processor option on August 4, 2020, making the 10-core model the base model. The iMac Pro was discontinued on March 5, 2021; Apple continued to sell the computer while supplies lasted. It was delisted from Apple's website and online store on March 19, 2021. Apple directed customers to either purchase an iMac, which had become faster than the iMac Pro, or to the Mac Pro. The discontinuation preceded the release of iMac models powered by Apple's custom processors, which pivoted the iMac line towards a more entry-level consumer focus; Apple targeted the enthusiast and professional market instead with more powerful Mac minis and a new machine, the Mac Studio.

== Reception ==
The iMac Pro was positively received. Jason Snell, writing for Macworld, said that it was clearly not for average customers, but filled a niche for users like himself who had drifted from using pro desktops to iMacs yet still wanted more power than Apple's consumer line could offer. Wired, ZDNet, and others considered the iMac Pro a statement from Apple that it was renewing its commitment to pro Macs. Ars Technica's Samuel Axon and Macworld's Dan Moren found that while the machine was priced and equipped beyond what a consumer would need, it fell short addressing every professional niche that the Mac Pro traditionally filled; The Verge's Dieter Bohn and PCMag's Tom Brant suggested that some professional users would want to hold off on buying an iMac Pro, since it was unclear at launch how it would compare to the upcoming Mac Pros.

Critics praised Apple for being able to fit a more powerful computer in the iMac's svelte frame. The identical design was considered a strength and weakness, with critics noting that the iMac Pro inherited the faults of the regular iMac's design, such as hard-to-reach ports, a wide bezel around the screen, and not allowing height adjustment using the stand. CNET's Lori Grunin faulted the professional machine for still using a consumer-class display from the base iMac, despite the all-in-one nature of the machine. Reviews noted that, even with its high-performance internals, the machine was quiet in operation.

Performance tests showed that the iMac Pro was highly performant, with PCMag ranking it as the fastest all-in-one computer they had tested. ZDNet's testing found that the iMac Pro regularly beat the iMac on most tasks, although depending on the workflow the speed might not justify the added cost. Though critics generally felt the high price was fair for the technology included, reviews often noted that most users could get a significant portion of the performance for much cheaper by getting a regular iMac. Grunin also questioned the wisdom of spending so much on an all-in-one machine when a user's needs could quickly outstrip the machine's capabilities. Subsequent iMac revisions narrowed the performance gap, with the cheaper models often faster in certain metrics.

After the iMac Pro's discontinuation, Jason Snell picked the machine as one of the greatest Macs of the 2010s, and one that helped tell the story of Apple during that period. Suggesting the iMac Pro was at one time intended to replace the Mac Pro entirely, Snell referred to it as "the ultimate pro Mac of an alternate timeline" where this had come to pass. Technology blogger John Gruber called the iMac Pro the best Mac of the Intel era.

== Technical specifications ==
Model	iMac Pro
Released	December 14, 2017
Discontinued	March 19, 2021
Model	iMacPro1,1
Display	27-inch Retina 5K display P3 color gamut display with 1.07 billion colors 5120 × 2880 resolution, 500 nits brightness
Processor	Intel Skylake-based Xeon W 8-core 3.2 GHz or 10-core 3.0 GHz Intel Xeon W processor Configurable to 14- or 18-core Intel Xeon W processor
Memory	32 GB of 2666 MHz DDR4 ECC SDRAM; Officially configurable to 64 GB, 128 GB or 256 GB
Graphics	AMD Radeon Pro Vega 56 with 8 GB HBM2 video memory Configurable to Vega 64 or 64X with 16 GB memory
Storage	1 TB SSD; Configurable to 2 TB or 4 TB
Camera	1080p FaceTime HD camera
Connectivity	4× USB-A 3.0; 4× Thunderbolt 3 (USB-C 3.1 gen 2); UHS-II SDXC card slot
Networking	Internal IEEE 802.11ac Wi-Fi (802.11a/b/g/n/ac); 10 Gigabit Ethernet; Bluetooth 5.0
Audio	Headphone/digital audio output Built-in stereo speakers
Weight	21.5 lb (9.7 kg)
Original OS	macOS High Sierra 10.13.2
Maximum OS	macOS Sequoia 15

== Timeline of iMac models ==
Timeline of iMac and eMac models
See also: List of Mac models
