= Mac Studio =

Desktop computer by Apple

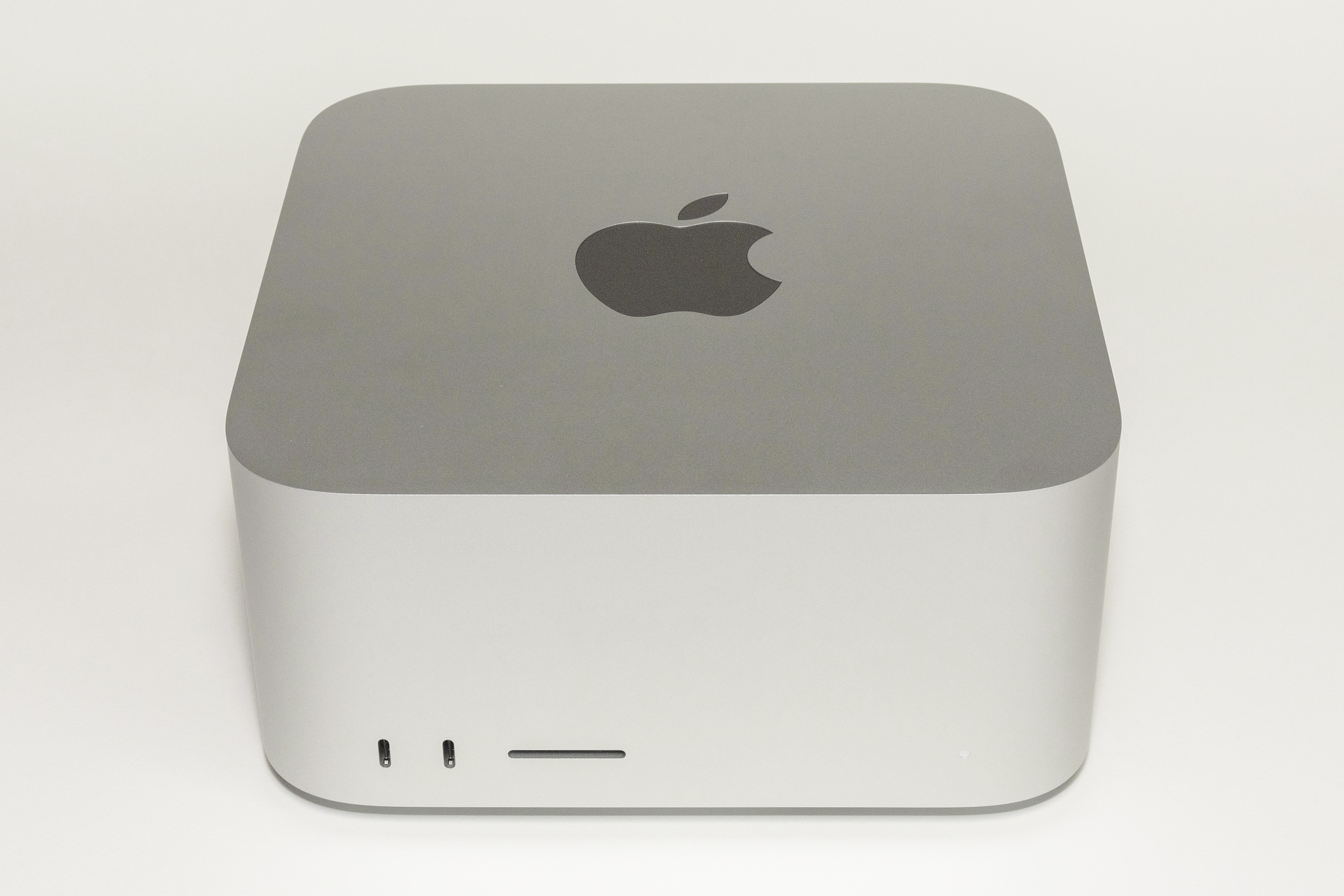
- Developer: Apple
- Product family: Macintosh
- Type: Compact desktop Workstation
- Released: March 18, 2022; 4 years ago
- Operating system: macOS
- System on a chip: Apple M series
- Predecessor: iMac Pro; Mac Pro
- Related: Mac Mini
- Website: apple.com/mac-studio

The Mac Studio is a small-form-factor workstation computer developed and marketed by Apple. It is Apple's professional Mac desktop, sitting above the consumer-range Mac Mini and iMac. It is configurable with either the M5 Max or M5 Ultra system on a chip.

== Overview ==
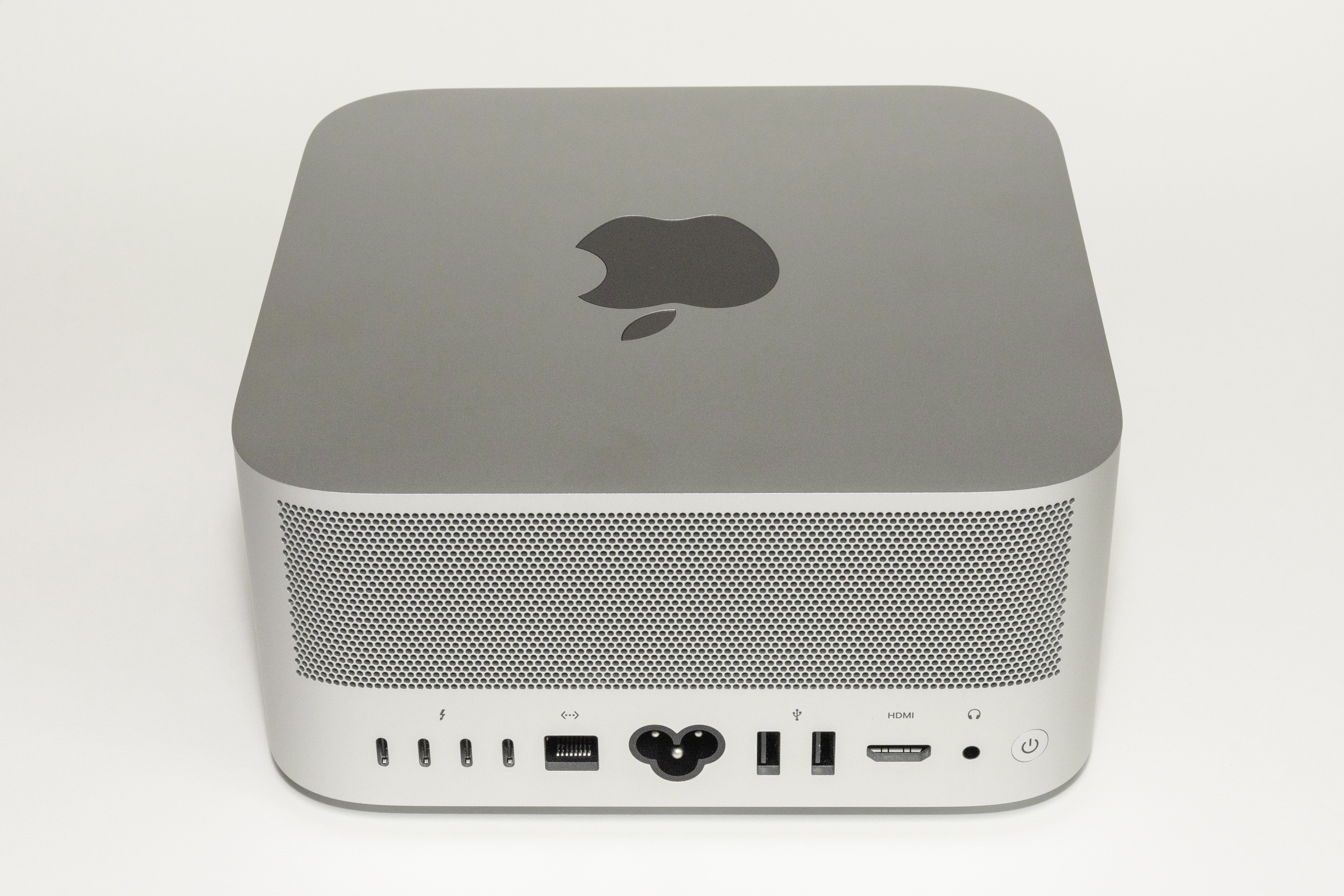
Rear ports

The Mac Studio is a desktop personal computer, designed to sit above the consumer-level Mac Mini. The computer's enclosure is made from extruded aluminum, with a width and depth of 7.7 inches (200 mm) and a height of 3.7 inches (94 mm). The Mac Studio is powered by either a Max or Ultra variant of Apple's M-series silicon. Mac Studio models with the Ultra SoC are heavier than the Max-equipped models, as they feature copper heat sinks rather than aluminum. The machines are cooled by double-sided blowers that draw air from the bottom of the case and expel it through the back.

Input/output devices are attached through ports on the front and back of the computer. The front panel has two USB-C ports and an SD card slot, while the back has an additional four USB-C ports, two USB Type-A ports, HDMI, 10 Gigabit Ethernet, and a headphone jack. On Max-equipped Mac Studio models, only the rear USB-C ports are Thunderbolt; on the Ultra models, the front USB-C ports are Thunderbolt-equipped as well. The Mac Studio features no PCIe slots or forms of expansion other than through attached peripherals, and most internal components cannot be upgraded after the fact. The Mac Studio has removable solid-state storage modules. It is possible to swap or upgrade these modules, though it requires a second computer to run Apple Configurator and set up the Mac Studio with its new storage.

== Development ==
Apple conceived of the Mac Studio as a product for creative professionals, who they noted were increasingly focused on multiple disciplines rather than very specific workloads. "[Before] if you wanted the pinnacle of performance in the personal computer space, you had to buy a very big, noisy tower that sat on the floor under your desk," product marketing executive Tom Boger recalled. Apple's idea was taking the amount of power and putting it in a dramatically smaller size. Apple had previously created similar miniature computers with the Power Mac G4 Cube and the 2013 Mac Pro.

== Release ==
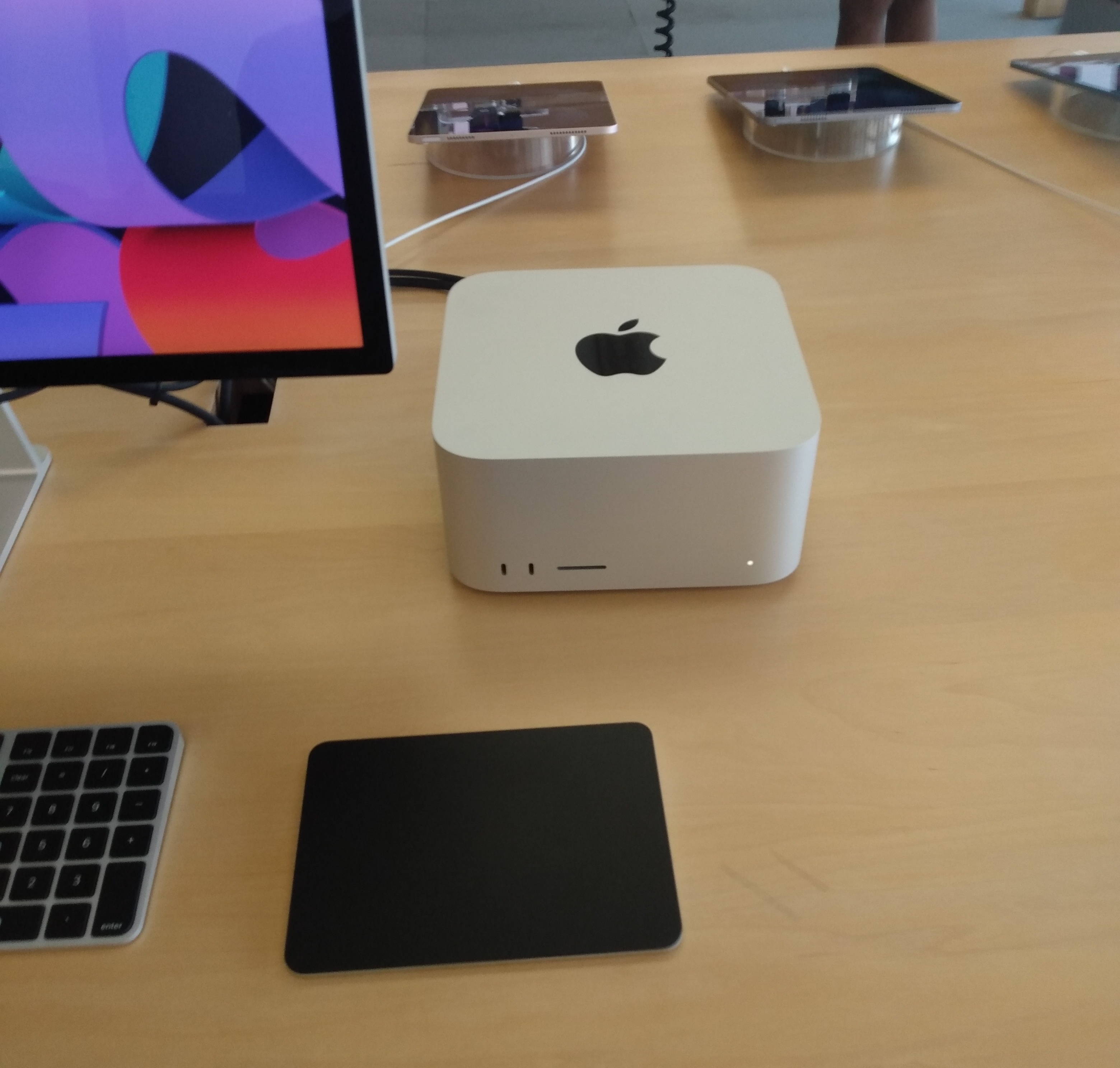
Mac Studio with Studio Display, Magic Keyboard, and Magic Trackpad in an Apple Store

The Mac Studio was initially offered in two ARM-based system on a chip (SoC): an M1 Max or the M1 Ultra, which combines two M1 Max chips in one package. Apple said the Mac Studio performed 50 percent faster than a Mac Pro with a 16-core Intel Xeon processor.

The Mac Studio was introduced alongside the Apple Studio Display, a 27-inch 5K monitor with an integrated 12 megapixel camera, six-speaker sound system with spatial audio and Dolby Atmos support and a height adjustable stand. Customers reported months-long shipping delays for the Mac Studio, attributed to a global chip shortage.

On June 5, 2023, during WWDC, Apple introduced updated Mac Studio models based on the M2 Max and M2 Ultra chips. Updates include Bluetooth 5.3, Wi-Fi 6E, the capability of running up to six 6K monitors, and support for 8K displays over Thunderbolt and HDMI.

On March 5, 2025, updated Mac Studio models were announced with M4 Max and M3 Ultra chips, which began shipping on March 12. Updates include support for AV1 decoding, hardware-accelerated ray tracing and Thunderbolt 5, with memory configurable up to 512 GB and storage configurable up to 16 TB on the M3 Ultra models. Despite the M4 chips being a newer generation than the M3 chips, the M3 Ultra was included in the high-end model due to there being no existing Ultra chips in the M4 line. The 512 GB option was removed in March 2026, and the 256 GB option in May 2026, likely due to the ongoing global memory supply shortage.

The Mac Studio was updated with the M5 Max and M5 Ultra chips on August 25, 2026. These models also feature faster storage, support for genlock over USB-C, and the Apple N1 networking chip with Wi-Fi 7 and Bluetooth 6. The models also support clustering up to four units over Thunderbolt to share memory. Models with 96 GB and 256 GB of memory started to ship on September 22, while the M5 Ultra model with 512 GB of memory shipped in October. Alongside the Mac Mini announced the same day, it is the final Apple product announced during Tim Cook's tenure as Apple CEO.

== Reception ==
The Mac Studio received positive reviews on release. Digital Photography Review's review called the machine "the Apple desktop we've been waiting for", citing the previous lack of a "pro Mac mini" offering, while writers such as The Wirecutter's Dave Gershgorn and Jason Snell noted the Studio filled a midrange role that had long been missing from Apple's product lineup. Reviews highlighted that it would not appeal to users with modest power requirements. Ars Technica's Andrew Cunningham considered it a nearly perfect desktop workstation that served that role better than the Intel-based iMacs Apple had previously offered, while The Verge's Monica Chin called the Studio "the computer professional Mac users have been waiting for."

The Studio's physical appearance was called understated and frequently compared to a taller Mac mini or stacked Apple TVs. The machine was praised for its number of ports, especially compared to other Apple products. Reviewer Brenda Stoylar noted that the machine tended to slide on certain surfaces due to the slippery underside if not held in place while inserting cables. Reviews noted the machine's quiet operation under heavy loads.

Reviewers comparing the product to Apple's other offerings found that the machine offered much more performance for less cost than the MacBook Pro line, although depending if the customer needed to buy a display and more peripherals, the price calculus changed. Reviews noted the Ultra-equipped Mac Studios came with a large price premium but would not necessarily deliver equivalent performance. Other complaints included the high cost of upgrades, particularly storage, and the fact that components couldn't be upgraded down the line.

When the M1-equipped models were released, reviews from Wired and The Verge found the Studio bested the Intel Mac Pro in performance. Performance evaluations found that it performed equivalently or better than competing PCs in most tasks, although game performance was weaker. Comparisons between the Studio and Mac Pro noted that unless users needed PCIe slots or a cleaner setup, the Studio offered equivalent power for much less.

== Specifications ==
Model	2022		2023		2025		M5 Max or M5 Ultra	
Announced date	March 8, 2022		June 5, 2023		March 5, 2025		August 25, 2026	
Released date	March 18, 2022		June 13, 2023		March 12, 2025		September 22, 2026	
Discontinued date	June 5, 2023		March 5, 2025		August 25, 2026		In production	
Chip	10-core Apple M1 Max, 24-core GPU, and 16-core Neural Engine; Configurable to 10-core CPU, 32-core GPU, and 16-core Neural Engine	20-core Apple M1 Ultra, 48-core GPU, and 32-core Neural Engine; Configurable to 20-core CPU, 64-core GPU, and 32-core Neural Engine	12-core Apple M2 Max, 30-core GPU, and 16-core Neural Engine; Configurable to 12-core CPU, 38-core GPU, and 16-core Neural Engine	24-core Apple M2 Ultra, 60-core GPU, and 32-core Neural Engine; Configurable to 24-core CPU, 76-core GPU, and 32-core Neural Engine	14-core Apple M4 Max, 32-core GPU, and 16-core Neural Engine; Configurable to 16-core CPU, 40-core GPU, and 16-core Neural Engine	28-core Apple M3 Ultra, 60-core GPU, and 32-core Neural Engine; Configurable to 32-core CPU, 80-core GPU, and 32-core Neural Engine	18-core Apple M5 Max, 32-core GPU, and 16-core Neural Engine; Configurable to 18-core CPU, 40-core GPU, and 16-core Neural Engine	30-core Apple M5 Ultra, 64-core GPU, and 32-core Neural Engine; Configurable to 36-core CPU, 80-core GPU, and 32-core Neural Engine
Memory	32 GB; Configurable to 64 GB	64 GB; Configurable to 128 GB	32 GB; Configurable to 96 GB	64 GB; Configurable to 192 GB	36 GB; Configurable to 64 GB (128 GB until May 5, 2026)	96 GB; Configurable to 512 GB until March 4, 2026	36 GB; Configurable to 128 GB	96 GB; Configurable to 512 GB
Storage	512 GB (Max) or 1 TB (Ultra) SSD; Configurable up to 8 TB				512 GB (Max) or 1 TB (Ultra) SSD; Configurable up to 8 TB (16 TB for Ultra)			
Wireless	Wi-Fi 6 (802.11ax); Bluetooth 5.0		Wi-Fi 6E (802.11ax); Bluetooth 5.3				Wi-Fi 7 (802.11be); Bluetooth 6 Thread networking technology	
Connectivity	4× Thunderbolt 4 and 2× USB-C ports (10 Gb/s); 2× USB-A ports (5 Gb/s); HDMI port 10Gb Ethernet; 3.5 mm headphone jack SDXC card slot	6× Thunderbolt 4 ports 2× USB-A ports (5 Gb/s); HDMI port 10Gb Ethernet; 3.5 mm headphone jack SDXC card slot	4× Thunderbolt 4 and 2× USB-C ports (10 Gb/s); 2× USB-A ports (5 Gb/s); HDMI port 10Gb Ethernet; 3.5 mm headphone jack SDXC card slot	6× Thunderbolt 4 ports 2× USB-A ports (5 Gb/s); HDMI port 10Gb Ethernet; 3.5 mm headphone jack SDXC card slot	4× Thunderbolt 5 and 2× USB-C ports (10 Gb/s); 2× USB-A ports (5 Gb/s); HDMI 2.1 port 10Gb Ethernet; 3.5 mm headphone jack SDXC card slot	6× Thunderbolt 5 ports 2× USB-A ports (5 Gb/s); HDMI 2.1 port 10Gb Ethernet; 3.5 mm headphone jack SDXC card slot	4× Thunderbolt 5 and 2× USB-C ports (10 Gb/s); 2× USB-A ports (5 Gb/s); HDMI 2.1 port 10Gb Ethernet; 3.5 mm headphone jack SDXC card slot	6× Thunderbolt 5 ports 2× USB-A ports (5 Gb/s); HDMI 2.1 port 10Gb Ethernet; 3.5 mm headphone jack SDXC card slot
Power	370 W				480 W			
Dimensions	3.7 in (9.4 cm) x 7.7 in (20 cm) x 7.7 in (20 cm)							
Weight	5.9 lb (2.68 kg)	7.9 lb (3.58 kg)	5.9 lb (2.68 kg)	7.9 lb (3.58 kg)	6.1 lb (2.77 kg)	8.0 lb (3.63 kg)	6.0 lb (2.72 kg)	8.0 lb (3.63 kg)
Greenhouse gas emissions	262 kg CO_{2}e	375 kg CO_{2}e	290 kg CO_{2}e	346 kg CO_{2}e	276 kg CO_{2}e	382 kg CO_{2}e	314 kg CO_{2}e	449 kg CO_{2}e

== Software and operating systems ==
The macOS operating system has been pre-installed on all Mac Studio computers since release, starting with version macOS Monterey, which is the first release of macOS to ship with the original Mac Studio.

Supported macOS releases
OS release	2022	2023	2025	2026
12 Monterey	12.2	—N/a	—N/a	—N/a
13 Ventura	Yes	13.4	—N/a	—N/a
14 Sonoma	Yes	Yes	—N/a	—N/a
15 Sequoia	Yes	Yes	15.2	—N/a
26 Tahoe	Yes	Yes	Yes	—N/a
27 Golden Gate	Yes	Yes	Yes	Yes

Timeline of Mac Pro and Mac Studio models
See also: List of Mac models
