= Magic Keyboard (Mac) =

Family of wireless keyboards made by Apple Inc.

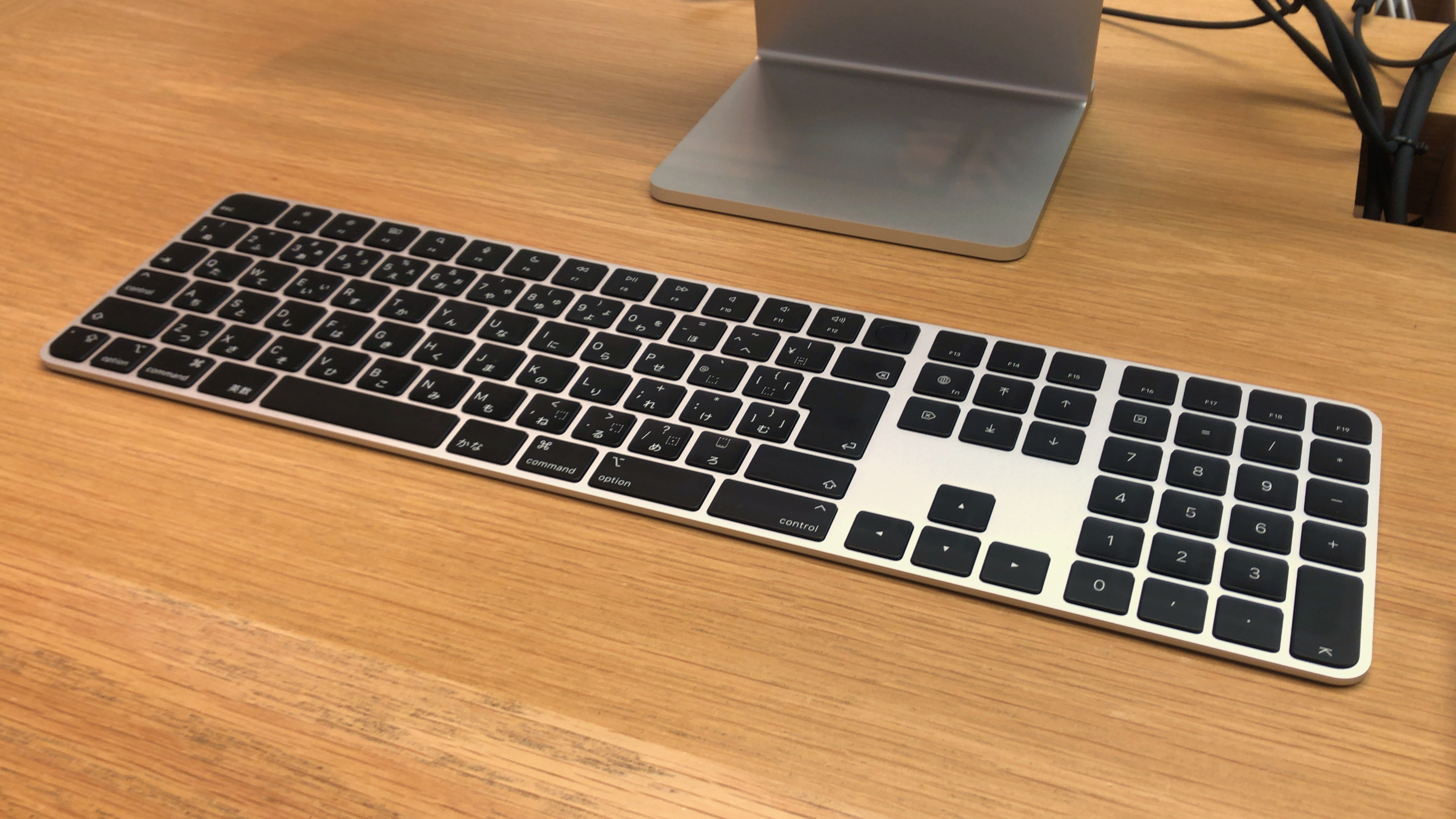
- Magic Keyboard with Touch ID and Numeric Keypad (Space Gray with black keys)
- Developer: Apple Inc.
- Manufacturer: Foxconn (contract manufacturer)
- Type: Bluetooth and USB keyboard
- Released: Original: October 13, 2015; 11 years ago With Numeric Keypad: June 5, 2017; 9 years ago 2021 revisions: May 21, 2021; 5 years ago
- Input: QWERTY keyboard
- Connectivity: Bluetooth 3.0+EDR; Lightning port (before October 28, 2024), USB-C port (after October 28, 2024)
- Power: Recyclable rechargeable Li-Po Battery (2980 mAh)
- Platform: Bluetooth-enabled Mac computer with OS X 10.11 or later and iOS devices with iOS 9.1 or later
- Dimensions: Magic Keyboard: 0.16–0.43 inch (0.41–1.09 cm) x 10.98 inches (27.9 cm) x 4.52 inches (11.49 cm); Magic Keyboard with Numeric Keypad: 0.16–0.43 inch (0.41–1.09 cm) x 16.48 inches (41.86 cm) x 4.52 inches (11.49 cm) (H x W x D)
- Weight: Magic Keyboard: 0.51 pound (0.231 kg); Magic Keyboard with Numeric Keypad: 0.86 pound (0.39 kg)
- Predecessor: Apple Wireless Keyboard
- Related: Magic Mouse 2 Magic Trackpad 2
- Website: www.apple.com/shop/mac/accessories/mice-keyboards

The Magic Keyboard is a family of wireless computer keyboards manufactured by Foxconn under contract for Apple Inc. The keyboards are bundled with the iMac and Mac Pro, and also sold as standalone accessories. They replaced the Apple Wireless Keyboard product line. Each Magic Keyboard model combination has a compact or full-size key layout for a specific region, a function key or Touch ID sensor next to F12, and color scheme variant.

Apple also refers to the internal keyboards in MacBooks released after November 2019 as the Magic Keyboard, which uses an identical scissor-mechanism with slightly shallower keys.

== Features ==
=== First generation ===
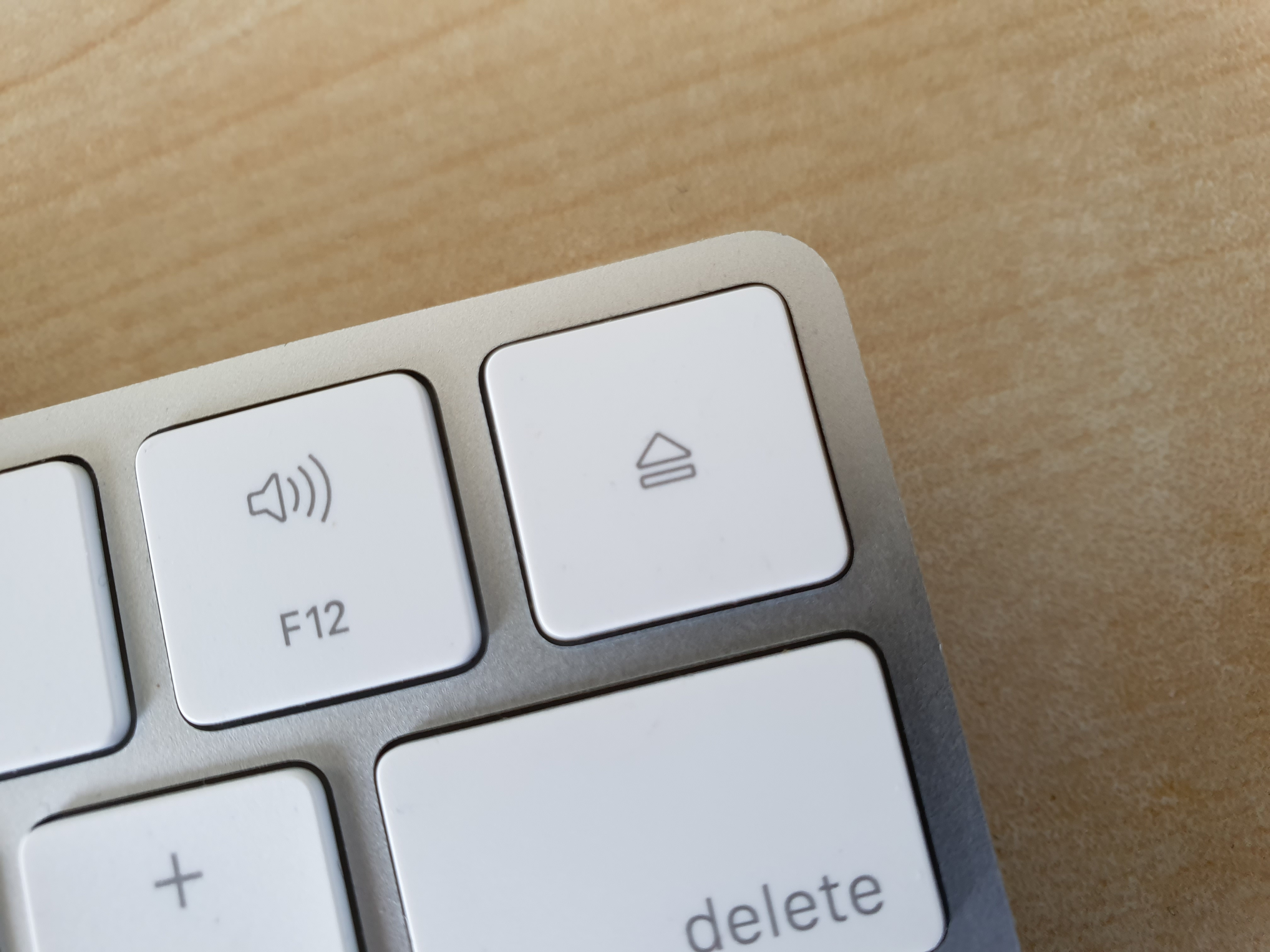
The eject key, a distinctive feature of the second generation Magic Keyboard

The original Magic Keyboard design was available in two models:

- (A1644) Magic Keyboard, first available in October 2015
- (A1843) Magic Keyboard with Numeric Keypad, first available in June 2017

This keyboard's design was similar to its predecessor, but had a lower profile. Apple re-engineered the scissor mechanism to increase key stability by 33 percent and reduce key travel. Typeface on the keys was also changed, from VAG Rounded to San Francisco (SF Compact).

It had a sealed non-replaceable rechargeable Lithium-ion battery which is charged via a Lightning port on the rear of the keyboard. The rechargeable battery can generally last up-to one month between charges. If connected to a computer using a USB to Lightning cable, it functions as a wired keyboard, not needing the Bluetooth connection. It used an ST Microelectronics STM32F103VB 72 MHz 32-bit RISC ARM Cortex-M3 processor and included the Broadcom BCM20733 Enhanced Data Rate Bluetooth 3.0 Single-Chip Solution.

It was compatible with Macs running OS X El Capitan and later, iPhones and iPads running iOS 9 or later, and TVs running Apple TV Software 7.0 or tvOS 10 or later.

==== Release ====
The Magic Keyboard (A1644) was released alongside the Magic Mouse 2 and the Magic Trackpad 2 in October 2015.

On June 5, 2017, Apple released the Magic Keyboard with Numeric Keypad (A1843) to replace the wired Apple Keyboard which was discontinued that day. It was longer, and had an extended key layout with a numeric keypad and a different arrow key arrangement. At the same time, the Magic Keyboard without the numeric keypad (A1644) received a minor visual update with new Control and Option key symbols.

A space gray Magic Keyboard with Numeric Keypad with black keys was bundled with the iMac Pro and later made available for standalone purchase.

A version in a silver finish with black keys was bundled with the 2019 Mac Pro, though never available as standalone purchase.

=== Second generation ===
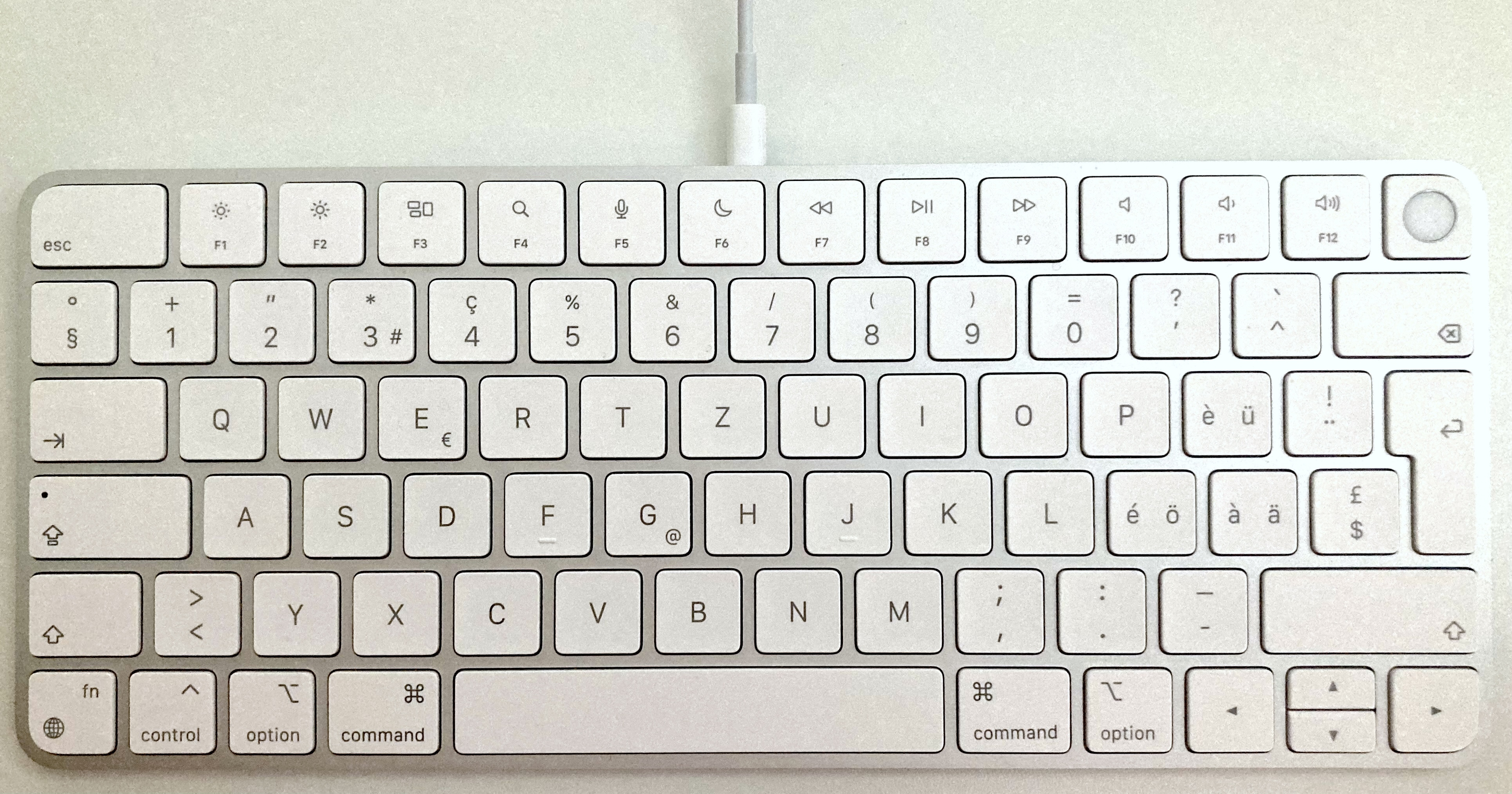
Second-generation Magic Keyboard with Touch ID, Swiss keyboard layout, and connected Lightning cable

An updated Magic Keyboard design introduced in 2021 includes asymmetric corner keys, eject key assigned to Sleep, fn key assigned to Input Source, and F4-F6 function keys reassigned to Spotlight, Dictation/Siri, and Do Not Disturb. Using this new design, two additional model options also include Touch ID sensors in place of the lock key. This update also discontinued the space gray Magic Keyboard with Numeric Keypad. The updated keyboard models include:

- A2449 Magic Keyboard with Touch ID: 78 keys
  - May 2021: Bundled with M1 iMac in any of seven colors: silver, pink, blue, green, purple, orange, or yellow
  - August 2021: Standalone ($149) (MK293LL/A EMC 3579): Silver
- A2450 Magic Keyboard with Lock Key: 78 keys
  - May 2021 (MK2A3LL/A $99 EMC 3619); Silver
  - May 2021: Bundled with M1 iMac 7-Core base model in any of seven colors: silver, pink, blue, green, purple, orange, or yellow
- A2520 Magic Keyboard with Touch ID and Numeric Keypad: 109 keys
  - May 2021: Bundled with M1 iMac in any of seven colors: silver, pink, blue, green, purple, orange, or yellow
  - August 2021: Standalone (MK2C3LL/A: Silver with white keys $179 EMC 3957)
  - March 2022: Standalone (MMMR3LL/A: Silver with black keys $199; EMC 3957)

The keyboards that have Touch ID sensors can scan the user's fingerprint to unlock Mac models that use Apple M-series chips. Keyboards that come bundled with the iMac M1 also have a color-matched aluminum finish.

The Magic Keyboard with Touch ID and Numeric Keypad (A2520) was available initially only in silver with white keys. On March 8, 2022, a version with black keys was introduced alongside the launch of the Mac Studio.

=== Third generation ===
The charging port was changed to USB-C in November 2024.

- A3118 Magic Keyboard with Touch ID: 78 keys
- A3119 Magic Keyboard with Touch ID and Numeric Keypad: 110 keys.
- A3203 Magic Keyboard with Lock Key: 78 keys

In this new model, a separate globe key has been added in the lower-left corner, resulting in four keys to the left of the space bar (Globe, Control, Option, Command).

== iPad version ==
In March 2020, Apple announced a Magic Keyboard with integrated trackpad for 2018 and newer iPad Pros with trackpad support which connects through Smart Connector. It also supports the iPad Air released later that year.
