= IMac (Apple silicon) =

All-in-one desktop computer designed and built by Apple

iMac (Apple silicon)

- iMac (24-inch, M1, 2021) in orange
- Developer: Apple
- Type: All-in-one
- Released: May 21, 2021
- System on a chip: Apple M-series
- Predecessor: iMac (Intel-based)
- Related: Mac Mini, Mac Studio, Mac Pro

The iMac, with Apple silicon, is a line of all-in-one desktop Macs made by Apple since 2021. The first major redesign of the iMac line since 2012, the case and internals were redesigned to use Apple's custom processors, starting with the M1 system on a chip. The Apple silicon iMac features a 24-inch (610 mm) screen in a thin aluminum enclosure, elevated off the resting surface by a foot, and comes in seven colors.

Apple started shipping the first Apple silicon iMacs on May 21, 2021. The line was revised in 2023 to use the Apple M3 chip, in 2024 to use the Apple M4, and in 2026 to use the Apple M6. Reception to the iMac has generally been positive; critics highlighted the design, ease of use, and portability as positive features, while the lack of ports and height adjustment, cost, and lack of a larger screen size were common criticisms.

== Overview ==
The Apple silicon iMac is an all-in-one personal computer, with the computer components integrated into an enclosure with the display. The Apple silicon iMac is the first major redesign to the line since 2012. In lieu of the two previous size options—21.5 inches (550 mm) and 27 inches (690 mm)—the Apple silicon iMac comes in a single 23.5-inch (600 mm; rounded to 24-inch) display size. The computer is flat-backed and 0.45 inches (11 mm) thick, with half the volume and roughly 30 percent smaller footprint than the 21.5-inch (550 mm) iMac. As it does not fit in the smaller enclosure, the power supply is located externally and connects magnetically to the computer. The display tilts on a hinge attached to a non-removable metal foot; there is no way to adjust the display's height. A VESA mounting option is configurable at purchase. USB-C ports are located on the back of the machine. The Gigabit Ethernet port is located on the power supply (dependent on configuration) and the 3.5 mm audio jack is on the left edge.

The iMac's Retina display, with a resolution of 4480 × 2520 pixels, is surrounded by a white bezel roughly half the width compared to its predecessor. The majority of the computer components are found in a small chin below the display. The computer comes in seven colors—silver, blue, green, pink, yellow, orange, and purple—in a two-tone finish, with a lighter pastel tint on the front of the computer, and a darker shade on the back. The included peripherals and power cords are color-matched to the finish, as are the macOS operating software accent color and wallpaper. Above the display is a 1080p-resolution webcam, with image signal processing performed by the Apple silicon. The iMac captures audio through an array of three microphones and outputs sound through a six-speaker system that supports Dolby Atmos.

The iMac comes in two different models. The cheaper models come with two Thunderbolt/USB4 ports next to the power button at the back edge of the computer and lack Gigabit Ethernet as standard. They also have lower-specification chips with fewer graphics processing unit (GPU) cores. The more expensive models add two USB-C ports, come with Gigabit Ethernet, have higher configurable storage options, and have a keyboard with Touch ID authentication. In early revisions, some colors were also exclusive to certain models. The memory and storage are soldered and not upgradeable, while other parts such as the speakers, ports, and webcam are modular and can be replaced if defective.

== Release ==
On June 22, 2020, Apple CEO Tim Cook announced the Mac would transition from Intel processors to Apple-designed processors that use the ARM64 architecture, branded as Apple silicon. Apple announced a 24-inch (610 mm) iMac based on the Apple M1 system on a chip on April 20, 2021. It is the first iMac available in multiple colors since the iMac G3, with Apple marketing manager Colleen Novielli saying the choice was made to make the new iMacs feel "light and optimistic"; CNET attributed the shift in part as a move away from minimalism and a return to nostalgia amid the work-from-home movement during the COVID-19 lockdowns. Apple also suggested the variety of colors helped the machine feel at home in more settings, whereas the previous silver iMacs were found in offices. Former Apple designer Jony Ive contributed to its development.

The initial M1 iMacs featured eight-core processors with either seven or eight GPU cores, 256 GB solid-state drives, and 8 GB of random access memory, configurable up to 2 TB of storage and 16 GB of memory. The iMacs ship with a Magic Mouse 2 or Magic Trackpad 2 with a color-matching aluminum underside. It could be configured with one of three updated Magic Keyboards with rounded corners: a standard version, a version with a Touch ID sensor, and an extended layout version with a numeric keypad and Touch ID. The Magic Keyboards with Touch ID are compatible with other Mac computers with Apple silicon but initially only shipped with the iMac.

Apple announced updated iMac models on October 30, 2023. These models featured the Apple M3 chip with eight CPU cores and up to ten GPU cores, faster Wi-Fi 6E and Bluetooth 5.3 connectivity, and up to 24 GB of memory. The M3 chip adds support for improved graphics features, such as raytracing in hardware. The models also include a Thread radio unannounced by Apple. The design, pricing, and other features remained identical. The line was revised again on October 28, 2024, with the Apple M4 chip. The M4 models feature modified colors, 16 GB memory as standard, an improved webcam that supports Center Stage, support two external displays, and come bundled with USB-C peripherals.

On October 27, 2026, updated models were announced with the M6 chip featuring the dual 16-core Neural Engine, a ten-core CPU, and a ten-core GPU. These models also include the N1 networking chip with Wi-Fi 7 and Bluetooth 6. A 2.5 Gigabit Ethernet port is standard on the power supply with the four-port model, and a build-to-order option with the two-port model. The M6 iMac retains the colors and design from the M4 model.

== Reception ==
The Apple silicon iMac received generally positive reviews from critics. Ars Technica's Samuel Axon and PCMag's Joe Osborne considered the iMac a return to the product line's roots as a simple computer for consumers. Reviewing the M1 model, PCMag's Tom Brant suggested the new iMac could define the next decades of desktop computing. Reviews often highlighted its role as an approachable computer for families. The reduced weight and size of the iMac made it easy to transport, with Jason Snell saying that while no one would use the iMac as a laptop it was far more mobile than its predecessor. In contrast Dan Seifert, writing for The Verge, questioned whether a "a simple all-in-one desktop computer is something most people want or need at this point".

The colorful redesign was generally praised as stylish and well-considered, with TechRadar's Matt Hanson writing that the "bold and modern" redesign had successfully refreshed a product that had become outdated. Some reviewers felt that the white bezels were a step down from the black of its predecessors, or that the bold look and bright colors were not for everyone. Katie Collins from CNET said the design was a statement piece that served as a "symbol of hope" while working from home during the COVID-19 pandemic; she considered this to be part of an anti-minimalism trend and the end to "austerity" in product design. Technology blogger John Gruber predicted its design would stand the test of time. Some reviews likened the design to a large iPad on a stand. Some reviews lamented the bulky external power brick, while others appreciated that the addition of ethernet on the brick allowed for reduced desktop clutter. Other points of praise were the improved webcam, speakers, and microphones.

The iMac's speed was positively noted, with Engadget testing finding the machine's responsiveness waking from sleep mode or starting up welcome. Monica Chin noted the iMac achieved higher single-core Geekbench performance scores than any previous iMac, including the iMac Pro. Benchmarks and testing found the Apple silicon iMacs performed similarly to other Apple computers with the same chip. The main weakness of the machines was noted as its graphics capabilities, though some reviewers of the M3 models were surprised by its games performance. Tom's Guide and Digital Trends found the entry-level iMac disappointingly limited and the added costs to add Touch ID unreasonable. PCMag, USA Today and others felt the machine quickly became pricey for the specs, as a similarly-performing Mac mini could be had for half the price.

Reviews found the iMac's display bright and clear, although in bright environments the glossy screen could cause glare. Wired and others criticized the removal of the larger 27-inch screen size, finding the smaller screen occasionally cramped. The continued lack of height adjustment on the display was faulted. Other complaints included the paltry number of ports and their placement, and the low amount of starting memory and storage in the entry-level machines.

The Apple silicon iMacs pivoted the line back to a consumer focus and away from enthusiast and professional use cases, a role it had grown into during the Intel-powered iMac era alongside stagnation of Apple's Mac Pro lineup in the 2010s. Snell found that the entry-level processor kept the iMac from being a choice for users who needed more power, and some critics wished for a higher-end and larger "iMac Pro".

== Specifications ==
iMac with Apple silicon specifications
| Model | 24-inch, 2021, two ports | 24-inch, 2021, four ports | 24-inch, 2023, two ports | 24-inch, 2023, four ports | 24-inch, 2024, two ports | 24-inch, 2024, four ports | 24-inch, M6, two ports | 24-inch, M6, four ports |
|---|---|---|---|---|---|---|---|---|
| Release date | May 21, 2021 | | November 7, 2023 | | November 8, 2024 | | November 6, 2026 | |
| Display | 24-inch (610 mm) 4.5K Retina display, 4480 × 2520 resolution at 218 pixels per inch with support for 1 billion colors 500 nits brightness with wide color (P3) and True Tone technology | | | | | | | |
| Chip | 8-core Apple M1 chip 7-core GPU; 16-core Neural Engine | 8-core Apple M1 chip 8-core GPU; 16-core Neural Engine | 8-core Apple M3 chip 8-core GPU; 16-core Neural Engine | 8-core Apple M3 chip 10-core GPU; 16-core Neural Engine | 8-core Apple M4 chip 8-core GPU; 16-core Neural Engine | 10-core Apple M4 chip 10-core GPU; 16-core Neural Engine | 10-core Apple M6 chip 10-core GPU; Dual 16-core Neural Engine | 12-core Apple M6 chip 12-core GPU; Dual 16-core Neural Engine |
| Memory | 8 GB unified memory Configurable to 16 GB | | 8 GB unified memory Configurable to 16 GB or 24 GB | | 16 GB unified memory Configurable to 24 GB | 16 GB unified memory Configurable to 24 GB or 32 GB | 16 GB unified memory Configurable to 24 GB | 16 GB unified memory Configurable to 24 GB or 32 GB |
| Storage | 256 GB; Configurable to 512 GB or 1 TB | 256 GB or 512 GB; Configurable to 1 TB or 2 TB | 256 GB; Configurable to 512 GB or 1 TB | 256 GB or 512 GB; Configurable to 1 TB or 2 TB | 256 GB; Configurable to 512 GB or 1 TB | 256 GB; Configurable to 512 GB, 1 TB or 2 TB | 256 GB; Configurable to 512 GB or 1 TB | 256 GB; Configurable to 512 GB, 1 TB, or 2 TB |
| Camera | 1080p FaceTime HD | | | | 12 MP Center Stage with support for Desk View | | | |
| Wireless | Wi-Fi 6 (802.11ax); Bluetooth 5.0 | | Wi-Fi 6E (802.11ax); Bluetooth 5.3 | | | | Wi-Fi 7 (802.11be); Bluetooth 6 Thread networking technology | |
| Connectivity | 2× Thunderbolt / USB 4 ports (up to 40 Gb/s); 3.5 mm headphone jack Configurable with Gigabit Ethernet | 2× Thunderbolt / USB 4 ports (up to 40 Gb/s); 2× USB 3 ports (up to 10 Gb/s); 3.5 mm headphone jack Gigabit Ethernet | 2× Thunderbolt / USB 4 ports (up to 40 Gb/s); 3.5 mm headphone jack Configurable with Gigabit Ethernet | 2× Thunderbolt / USB 4 ports (up to 40 Gb/s); 2× USB 3 ports (up to 10 Gb/s); 3.5 mm headphone jack Gigabit Ethernet | 2× Thunderbolt / USB 4 ports (up to 40 Gb/s); 3.5 mm headphone jack Configurable with Gigabit Ethernet | 4× Thunderbolt 4 ports (up to 40 Gb/s); 3.5 mm headphone jack Gigabit Ethernet | 2× Thunderbolt / USB 4 ports (up to 40 Gb/s); 3.5 mm headphone jack Configurable with 2.5 Gb Ethernet | 4× Thunderbolt 4 ports (up to 40 Gb/s); 3.5 mm headphone jack 2.5 Gb Ethernet |
| Input | Magic Keyboard & Magic Mouse; Configurable with Magic Keyboard with Touch ID, Magic Keyboard with Touch ID and Numeric Keypad, and Magic Trackpad | | | | | | | |
| Power | 143 W power adapter | | | | | | | |
| Dimensions | 18.1 in × 21.5 in × 5.8 in (46.0 cm × 54.6 cm × 14.7 cm) | | | | | | | |
| Weight | 9.83 pounds (4.46 kg) | 9.88 pounds (4.48 kg) | 9.75 pounds (4.42 kg) | 9.87 pounds (4.48 kg) | 9.74 pounds (4.42 kg) | 9.79 pounds (4.44 kg) | 9.74 pounds (4.42 kg) | 9.79 pounds (4.44 kg) |
| Greenhouse gas emissions | 481 kg CO_{2}e | 486 kg CO_{2}e | 359 kg CO_{2}e | 389 kg CO_{2}e | 346 kg CO_{2}e | 391 kg CO_{2}e | 326 kg CO_{2}e | 351 kg CO_{2}e |
| Colors | Blue Green Pink Silver | Blue Green Pink Silver Yellow Orange Purple | Blue Green Pink Silver | Blue Green Pink Silver Yellow Orange Purple | Blue Purple Pink Orange Yellow Green Silver | | | |

== Timeline of iMac models ==
Timeline of iMac and eMac models
See also: List of Mac models
