= IMazing =

Mobile device management software

iMazing
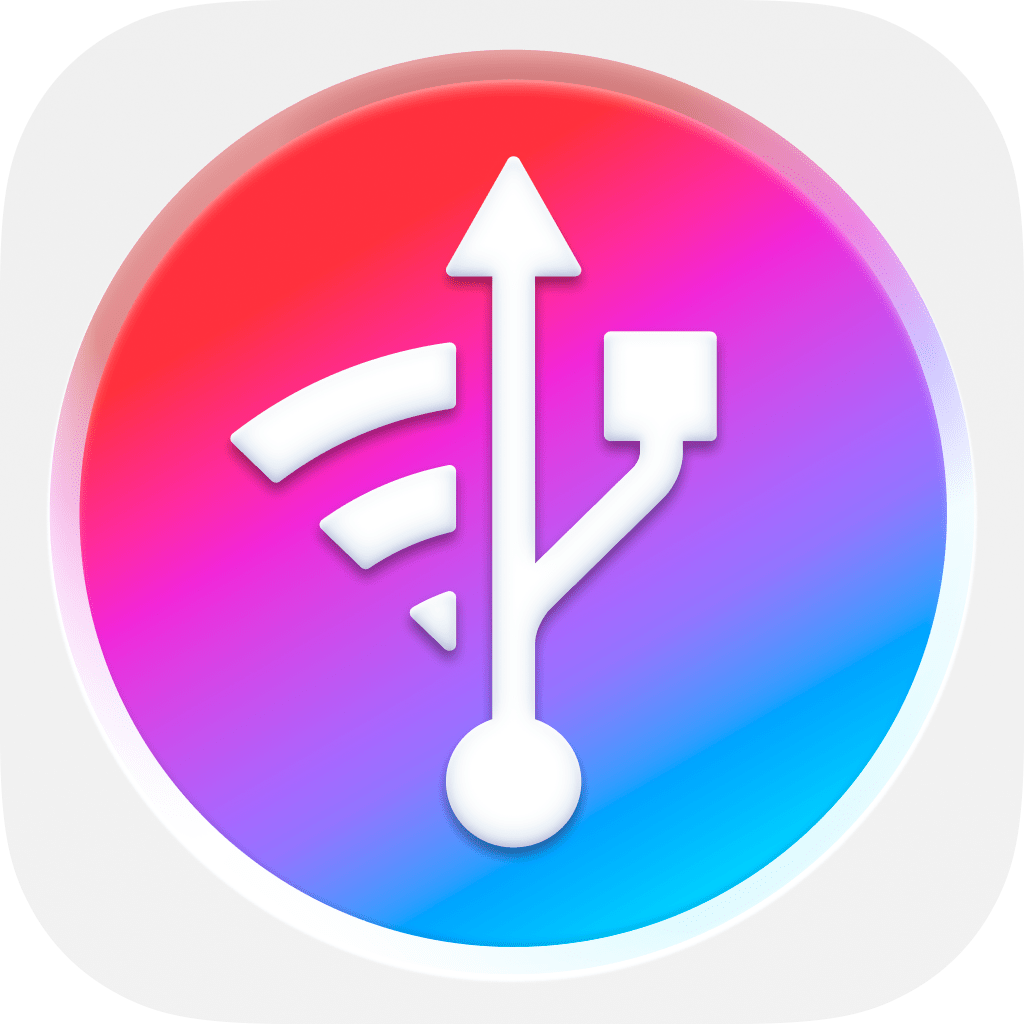
- Developer: DigiDNA
- Release: DiskAid (2008)
- Stable release: 3.5.2 / 8 April 2026; 4 months ago
- Operating system: Windows 7 or later; OS X El Capitan or later
- Platform: Microsoft Windows and macOS
- Size: 199.6 MB (Windows), 282.2 MB (macOS)
- Available in: English, German, French, Spanish, Italian, Portuguese, Russian, Arabic, Chinese, Japanese, Korean
- License: Proprietary
- Website: www.imazing.com

iMazing is mobile device management software that allows users to transfer files and data between iOS devices (iPhone, iPad and iPod Touch) and macOS or Windows computers, in addition to many other features beyond the scope of what Apple's own tools enable.

== History ==
Developed by DigiDNA, iMazing was initially released in 2008 as DiskAid, enabling users to transfer data and files from the iPhone or iPod Touch to Mac or Windows computers. DiskAid was renamed iMazing in 2014. Version 2.0 was released on September 13, 2016.

In August 2021, version 2.14 of iMazing added a spyware detection feature. The feature is based on Amnesty International's Mobile Verification Toolkit to detect Pegasus Spyware following the publication of Pegasus Project.

== Description ==
With iMazing, an iPhone or iPad can be used similarly to an external hard drive. It performs tasks that iTunes doesn't offer, including incremental backups of iOS devices, browsing and exporting text and voicemail messages, managing apps, encryption, and migrating data from an old phone to a new one.

The menu bar app iMazing Mini enables automatic, wireless and encrypted backups of iPhones. The iMazing HEIC Converter is a free desktop app for Mac and PC that lets users convert photos from HEIC format to JPG or PNG.

== See also ==
- iTunes
- Apple Configurator
