= Magic Mouse =

Computer mice developed and released by Apple Inc.

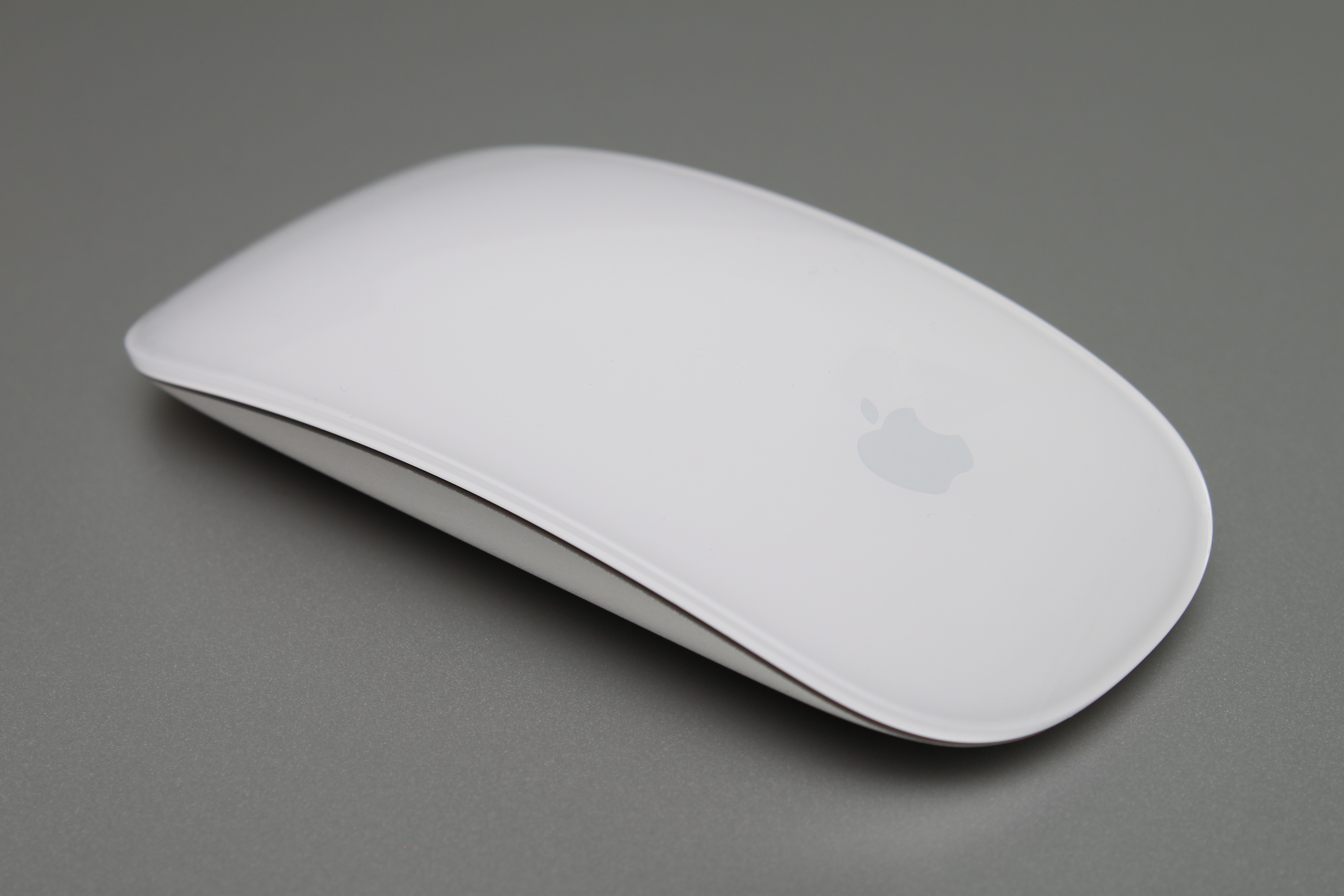
- White and silver Magic Mouse
- Manufacturer: Apple Inc. Foxconn (contract manufacturer)
- Type: Multi-touch clear acrylic surface with laser tracking mouse
- Released: 1st gen: October 20, 2009; 16 years ago; 2nd gen: October 13, 2015; 10 years ago
- Discontinued: 1st gen: October 13, 2015
- Operating system: 1st generation: Mac OS X Leopard 10.5.8 and later; 2nd generation (Lightning): OS X El Capitan 10.11 or later iPadOS 13.4 or later; 2nd generation (USB-C): macOS Sequoia 15.0 or later
- Connectivity: 1st gen: Bluetooth 2.1; 2nd gen: Bluetooth 3.0, Lightning port (before October 28, 2024), USB-C port (after October 28, 2024)
- Power: 1st gen: 2 AA batteries; 2nd gen: 1986 mAh rechargeable Li-Po battery
- Dimensions: 2.16 cm × 5.71 cm × 11.35 cm; (0.85 in × 2.25 in × 4.47 in)
- Weight: 1st gen: 0.23 lb (105 g; including batteries); 2nd gen: 0.22 lb (99 g)
- Predecessor: Mighty Mouse
- Related: Apple Wireless Keyboard; Magic Keyboard; Magic Trackpad
- Website: Magic Mouse

The Magic Mouse is a multi-touch wireless computer mouse sold by Apple Inc. and manufactured by Foxconn. The first-generation Magic Mouse was released on October 20, 2009, and introduced multi-touch functionality to a computer mouse. Following the iPhone, iPod Touch, and multi-touch MacBook touchpads, the Magic Mouse supports multi-touch gestures and inertia scrolling across the surface of the mouse. It is designed for use with macOS.

The second-generation Magic Mouse, initially marketed as the Magic Mouse 2, was released on October 13, 2015. It uses a non-removable lithium-ion rechargeable battery and originally included a Lightning port for charging and pairing. It was later made fully compatible with iPadOS. An October 2024 revision replaced the Lightning port with a USB-C port.

== Models ==
=== 1st generation (A1296) ===
The first-generation Magic Mouse was released on October 20, 2009, and introduced multi-touch functionality. It connects wirelessly to a Mac computer via Bluetooth. It is powered by two AA batteries and uses a solid-state laser tracking sensor, similar to the previous-generation wireless Mighty Mouse. Apple included two non-rechargeable batteries in the box. Until 2016, Apple sold an Apple Battery Charger with two rechargeable NiMH AA batteries designed for use with Mac peripherals.

Like its predecessor, the Mighty Mouse, the Magic Mouse supports secondary click. The Magic Mouse has been included with most desktop Mac computers since its introduction, including the iMac, iMac Pro, and third-generation Mac Pro, and has also been sold separately.

The Magic Mouse borrows design elements from the preceding Apple Pro Mouse, including its seamless "zero-button" design and translucent acrylic surface. Its multi-touch surface enables 360-degree scrolling, replacing the rubber scroll ball used on the Mighty Mouse. The mouse does not support left- and right-clicking simultaneously and does not support middle click without third-party software workarounds.

=== 2nd generation (A1657) ===
The second-generation Magic Mouse was introduced in October 2015 alongside the Magic Keyboard and second-generation Magic Trackpad. A space gray color was introduced with the iMac Pro in 2017 and later became available as a standalone purchase. iPadOS 13.4 introduced mouse support to iPads and supports all functionality of the second-generation Magic Mouse.

A variety of pastel colors were introduced in 2021 to match the colors of the M1 iMac. Standalone purchases included a USB-C to Lightning cable instead of a USB-A to Lightning cable. In 2022, the space gray color was replaced by a black color with a silver aluminum finish, which was originally available only with the third-generation Mac Pro. Colors of the second-generation Magic Mouse have been introduced alongside matching colors for various Magic Keyboard models.

==== 2nd generation with USB-C (A3204) ====
On October 28, 2024, Apple released an updated Magic Mouse that replaced the Lightning charging port with a USB-C port. It requires a Mac running macOS Sequoia or later to function properly.

== Criticism ==
=== 1st generation ===
Initial reception to the Magic Mouse was mixed. Reviewers criticized its inability to trigger Exposé, Dashboard, or Spaces, as its predecessor could, and its lack of native middle-click support. Later versions of Mac OS X added gestures for opening Mission Control, which incorporates functionality from Exposé, Dashboard, and Spaces. Other reported issues included unstable connections with first- and second-generation Mac Pro models and a low-profile design that some users found uncomfortable or unergonomic, causing palm aches or hand cramping.

=== 2nd generation ===
When the second-generation Magic Mouse was released in 2015, Apple's decision to place the Lightning charging port on the underside of the mouse, making it unusable while charging, was widely criticized by reviewers. Critics also noted the omission of Force Touch technology, which was included in the second-generation Magic Trackpad.

When Apple refreshed the Magic Mouse in 2024 with USB-C charging, the port remained on the underside of the mouse, renewing criticism of the design. Some reviewers also noted that the switch from Lightning to USB-C was the only substantial change to the mouse in nine years.

== Gallery ==
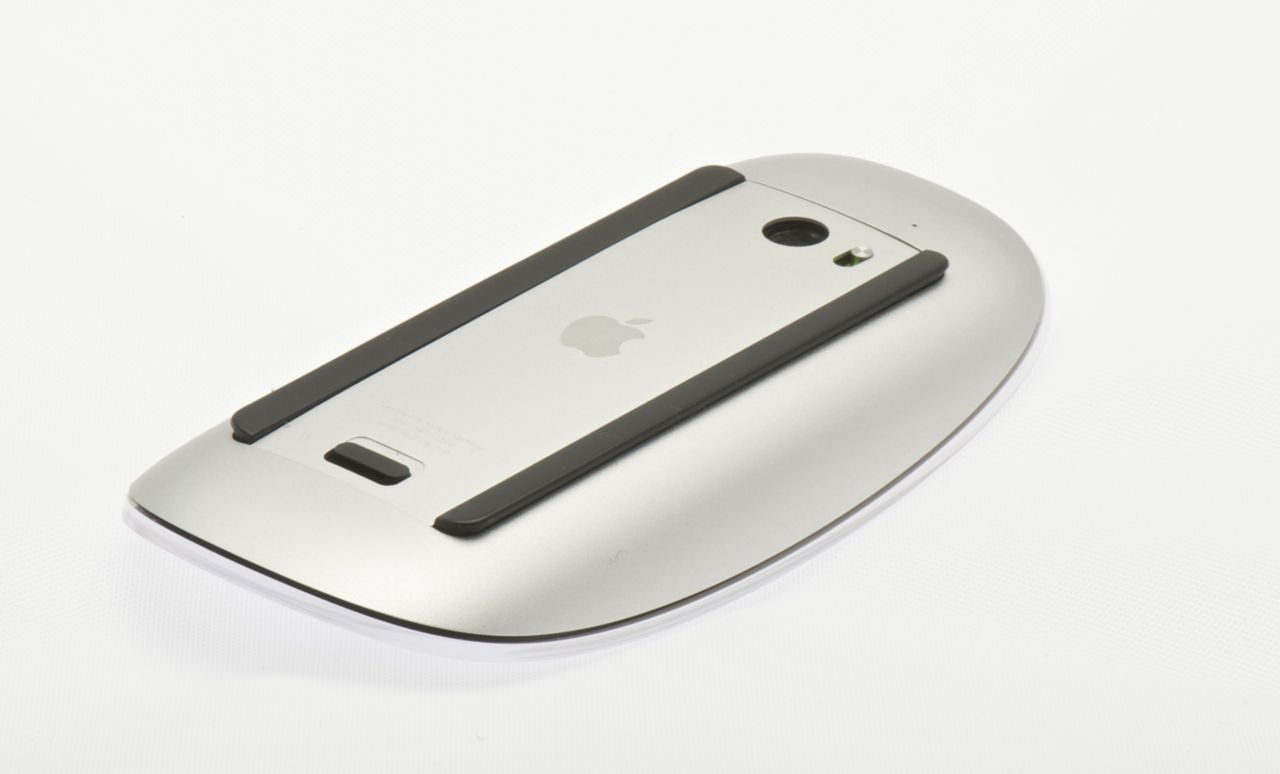
The underside of the first-generation Magic Mouse, showing the battery cover

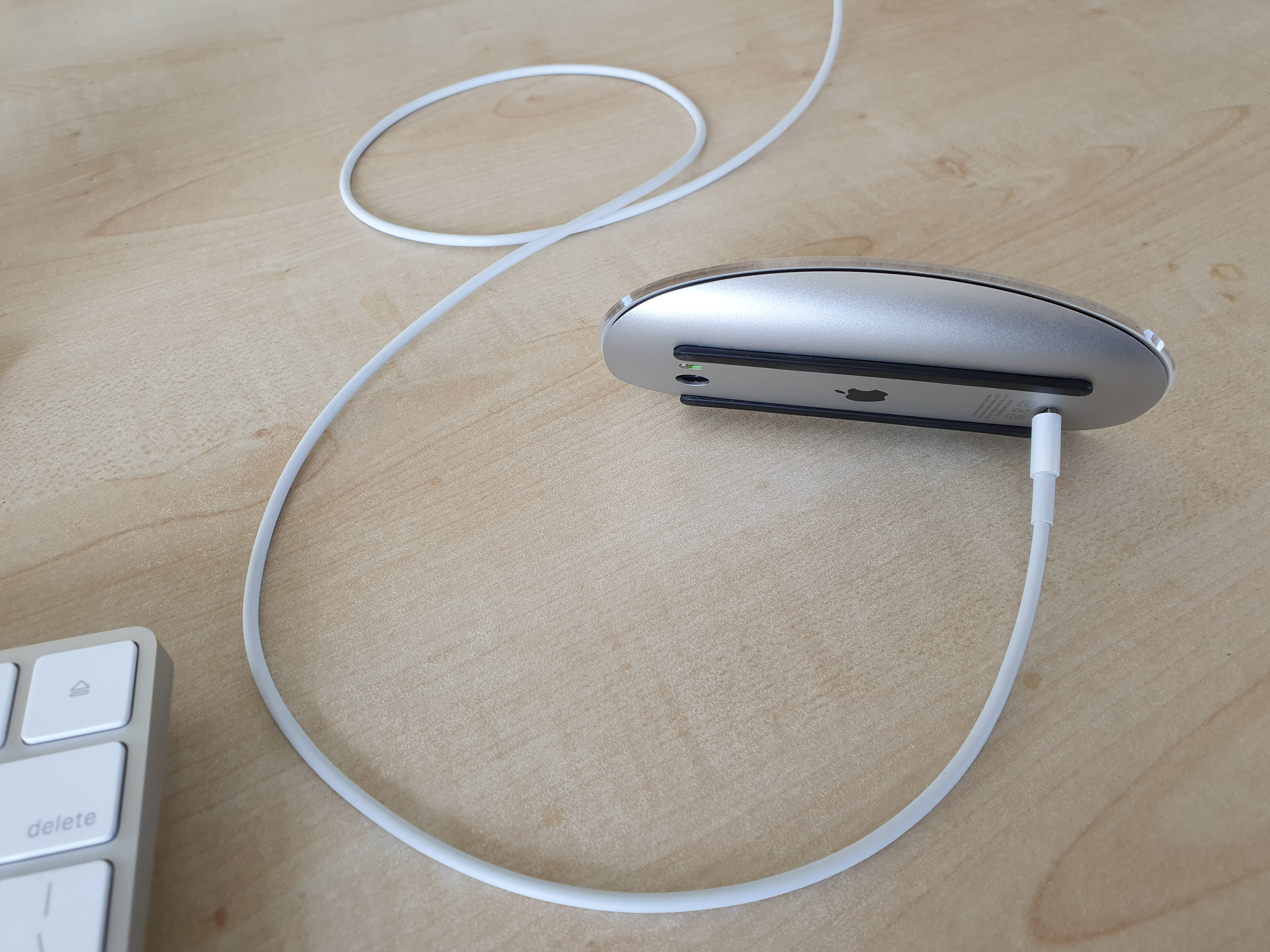
The charging port of the second-generation Magic Mouse is located on its underside, preventing the mouse from being used while charging.

== See also ==
- Apple pointing devices
- Apple keyboards
- Apple Wireless Keyboard
- Magic Keyboard
- Magic Trackpad
