= Apple Configurator =

Application developed by Apple Inc

- Logo
- Developer: Apple
- Operating system: macOS 14 and higher
- Type: Utility
- License: Proprietary
- Website: Mac App Store

Apple Configurator is an application developed by Apple and is available for free download on the Mac App Store. It was first launched in 2012. It replaces the Apple Configurator, which was first launched in March 2012, and iPhone Configuration Utility.

The application allows for mass-configuration of iOS, iPadOS and tvOS devices for business and educational organizations. It provides remote management by an IT administrator to help set up and maintain standard configuration and software across a number of devices.
