= Magic Trackpad =

Pointing device by Apple

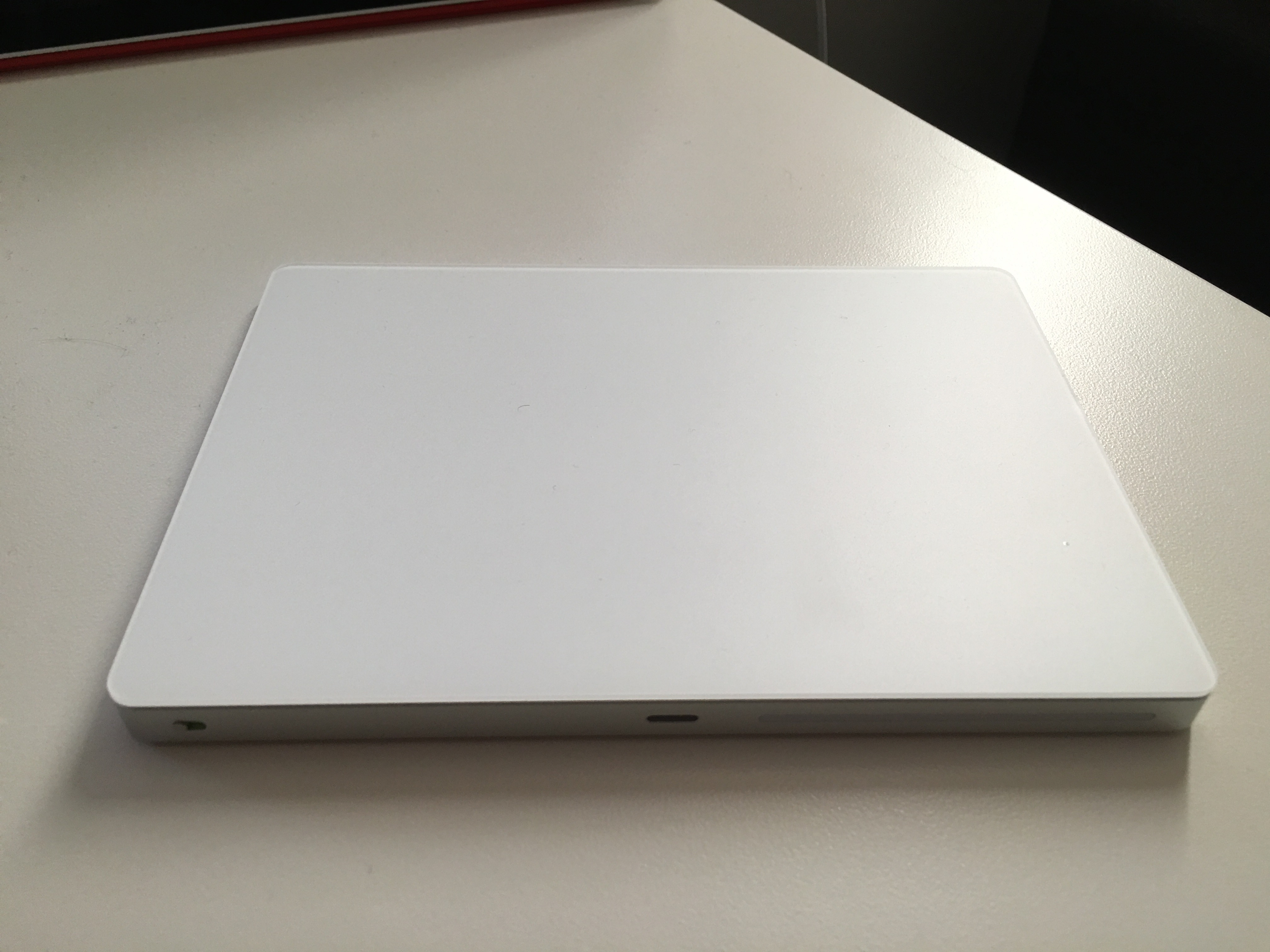
- The second generation Magic Trackpad (2015)
- Manufacturer: Apple Inc.
- Type: Multi-touch trackpad
- Released: 1st gen.: July 27, 2010; 2nd gen.: October 13, 2015 (Lightning); April 20, 2021 (redesigned with rounded corners and additional color options); October 28, 2024 (USB-C)
- Discontinued: 1st gen.: October 13, 2015
- Connectivity: 1st gen.: Bluetooth 2.0; 2nd gen.: Bluetooth 3.0, Lightning or USB-C port
- Power: 1st gen.: Two AA batteries; 2nd gen.: Rechargeable Li-Po battery (2024 mAh)
- Dimensions: 1st gen.: 5.1 × 5.2 in (130 × 130 mm); 2nd gen.: 0.19–0.43 × 6.3 × 4.52 in (4.8–10.9 × 160.0 × 114.8 mm)
- Weight: 1st gen.: 0.31 lb (0.14 kg); 2nd gen.: 0.51 lb (0.23 kg)
- Related: Magic Mouse

The Magic Trackpad is a multi-touch and force touch trackpad produced by Apple Inc. The first generation version was released on July 27, 2010, and featured a trackpad 80% larger than the built-in trackpad found on the then-current MacBook family of laptops. A redesigned second generation version, initially marketed as Magic Trackpad 2, was released on October 13, 2015.

== Models ==
=== 1st generation ===
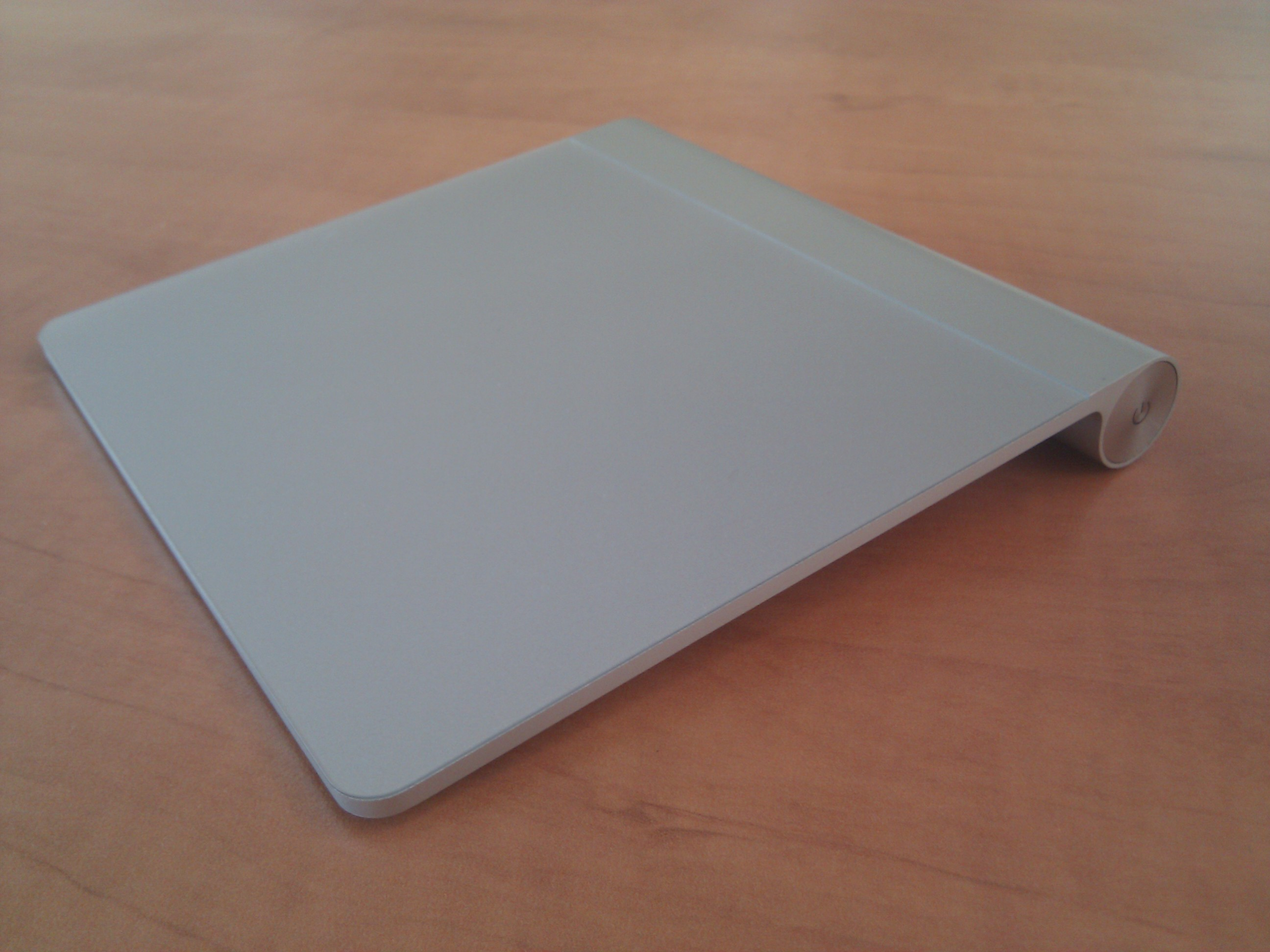
The first generation Magic Trackpad

The first generation Magic Trackpad was released on July 27, 2010. It is made of glass and aluminum in the same style as Apple's Wireless Keyboard and sits flush with it. The entire trackpad can be used as a button, pressing down on the trackpad puts pressure on two circular feet below to register a click. The trackpad connects via Bluetooth and is powered by two AA batteries.

=== 2nd generation ===
The second generation Magic Trackpad, initially marketed as the Magic Trackpad 2, was released on October 13, 2015, alongside the Magic Keyboard and Magic Mouse 2. It has 29% more surface area than the first generation model, features an enclosed wedge design, and adds support for Force Touch. It also provides haptic feedback via Apple's built-in Taptic Engine that is also used in MacBook trackpads. It includes a built-in rechargeable lithium-ion battery and uses the Lightning connector for charging and pairing. Released in 2020, iPadOS 13.4 introduced mouse support to iPads for the first time, and supports all functionality of the second-generation Magic Trackpad.

It was originally released in white, and was followed by a space gray version that was introduced with the iMac Pro in 2017 alongside a color-matching Magic Keyboard; both were later made available as standalone purchases. Seven pastel models (red, pink, orange, yellow, green, blue, and purple) were introduced in 2021 to match the colors of the M1 iMac. Additionally, standalone purchases included a USB-C to Lightning cable instead of a USB-A cable. The physical design of the device was also updated at this time, with the Magic Trackpads bundled with the M1 iMac and later releases featuring larger corner radii than earlier 2nd generation Magic Trackpads. In 2022, the space gray color was replaced by a black-and-silver version which was previously only available bundled with the third-generation Mac Pro. On October 28, 2024, Apple released an updated Magic Trackpad that replaced the Lightning charging port with a USB-C port.

== Reception ==
Reviews of the first generation Magic Trackpad lauded its design but criticized its price. Scott Stein of CNET wrote, "Apple's $69 Bluetooth device is minimalist and not particularly cheap"; "We're not sure we'd ditch our mouse and use the Magic Trackpad, but it's a compact solution for the touch-addicted." Macworld also praised the trackpad's design similarity with the Apple Wireless Keyboard: "The Magic Trackpad is the same height and angle of inclination as the Apple Wireless Keyboard, making them a good fit, in terms of size and style."

In reviews of the second-generation Magic Trackpad, reviewers praised the new Force Touch functionality, better ergonomics over the Magic Mouse, and full compatibility with macOS and iPadOS, but noted its high price tag.

== See also ==
- Apple pointing devices
- Apple keyboards
- Apple Wireless Keyboard
- Magic Keyboard
- Magic Mouse
