= Apple Wireless Keyboard =

Wireless keyboards made by Apple Inc.

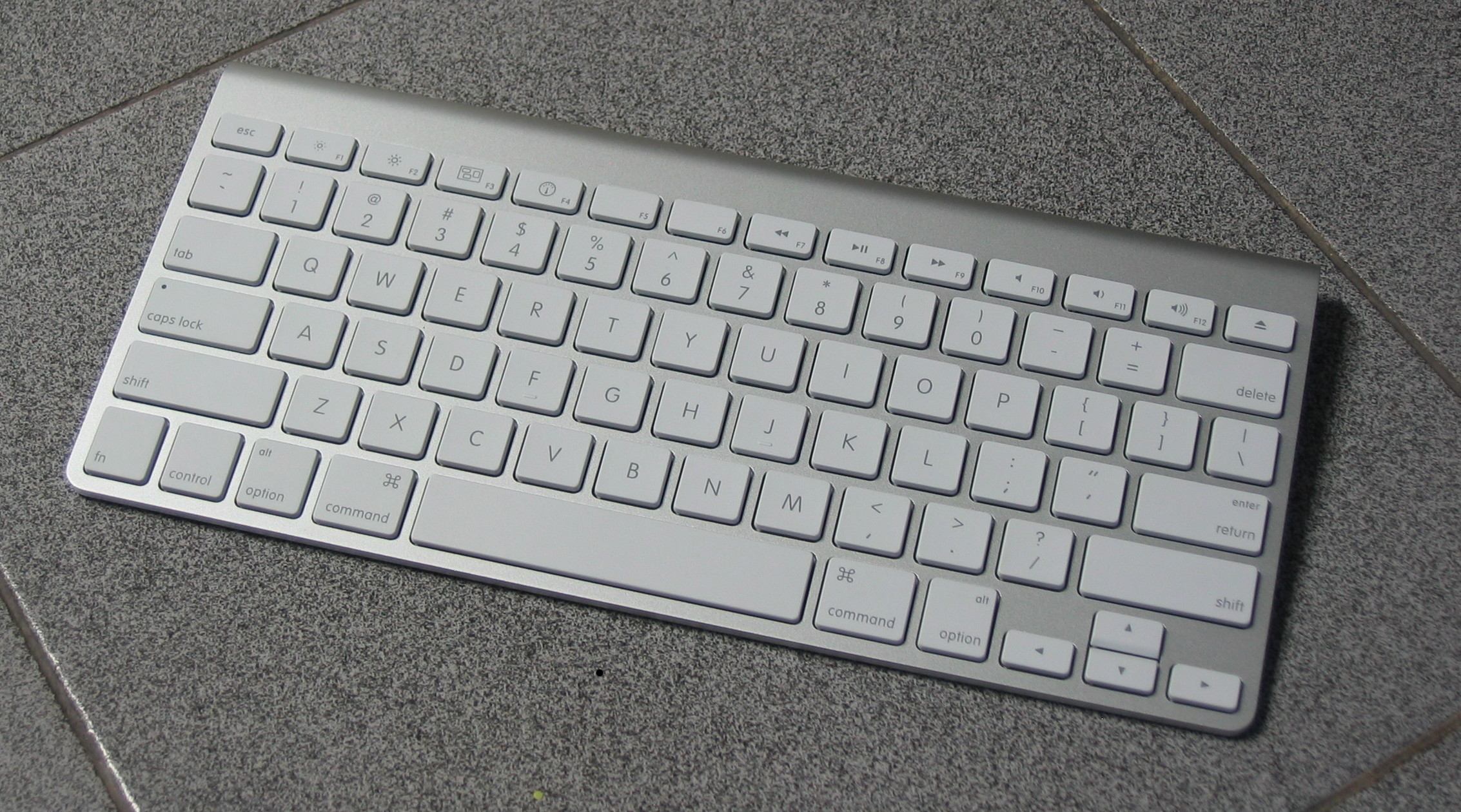
- Second generation Apple Wireless Keyboard (2007) with US English layout
- Branding: Apple Inc.
- Manufacturer: Foxconn
- Product family: Apple Keyboard
- Keyswitches: Scissor switch
- Keycaps: Laser-etched chiclet keyboard
- Interface: Bluetooth
- Introduced: September 16, 2003
- Discontinued: October 13, 2015
- Successor: Magic Keyboard
- Website: Apple.com – Keyboard

The Apple Wireless Keyboard is a wireless keyboard built for Macintosh computers and compatible with iOS devices. It interacts over Bluetooth wireless technology and unlike its wired version, it has no USB connectors or ports. Both generations have low-power features when not in use. It was discontinued on October 13, 2015, and was succeeded by the new Magic Keyboard.

== History ==
=== First generation (A1016) M9270LL/A (4 batteries) ===
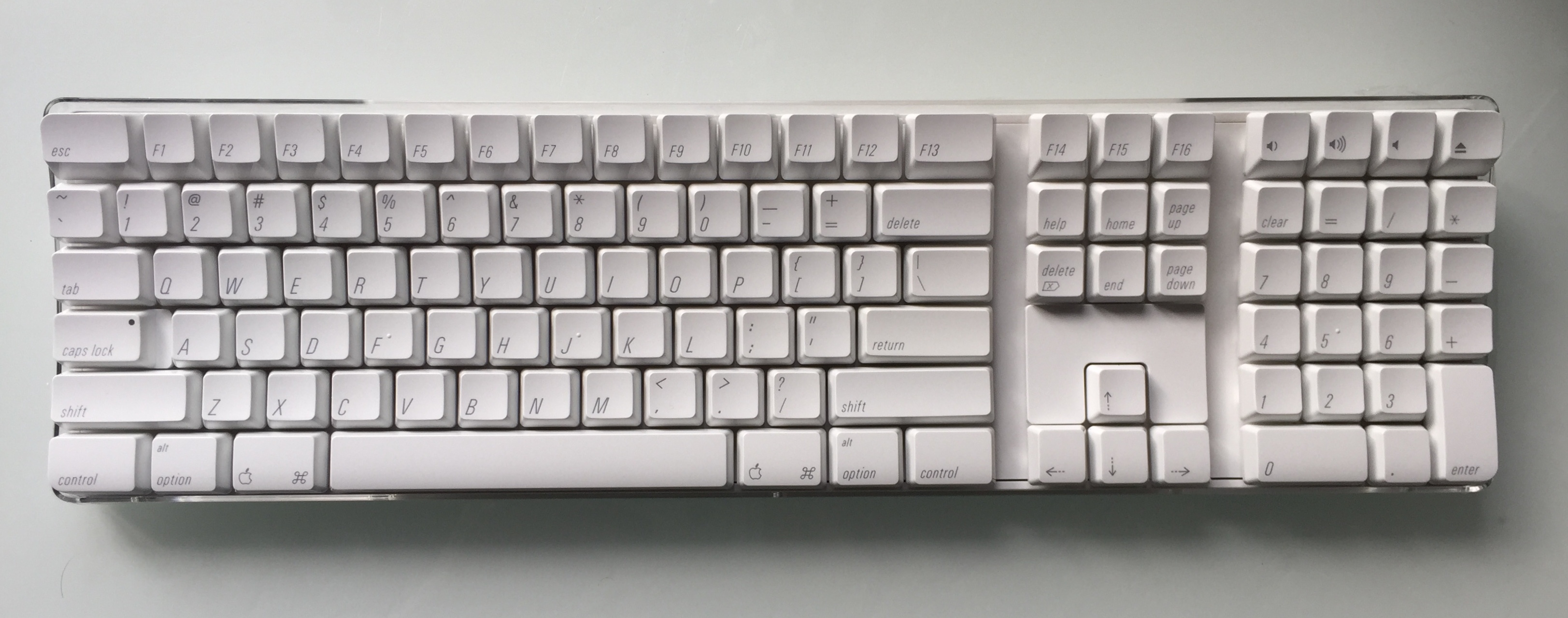
Apple Wireless Keyboard (A1016)

The first generation Apple Wireless Keyboard was released at the Apple Expo on September 16, 2003.

It was based on the updated wired Apple Keyboard (codenamed A1048), and featured white plastic keys housed in a clear plastic shell. Unlike the wired keyboard, there are no USB ports to connect external devices. The bottom of the keyboard features space for four AA batteries and has an on/off switch.

=== Second generation (A1255) MB167LL/A (3 batteries) ===
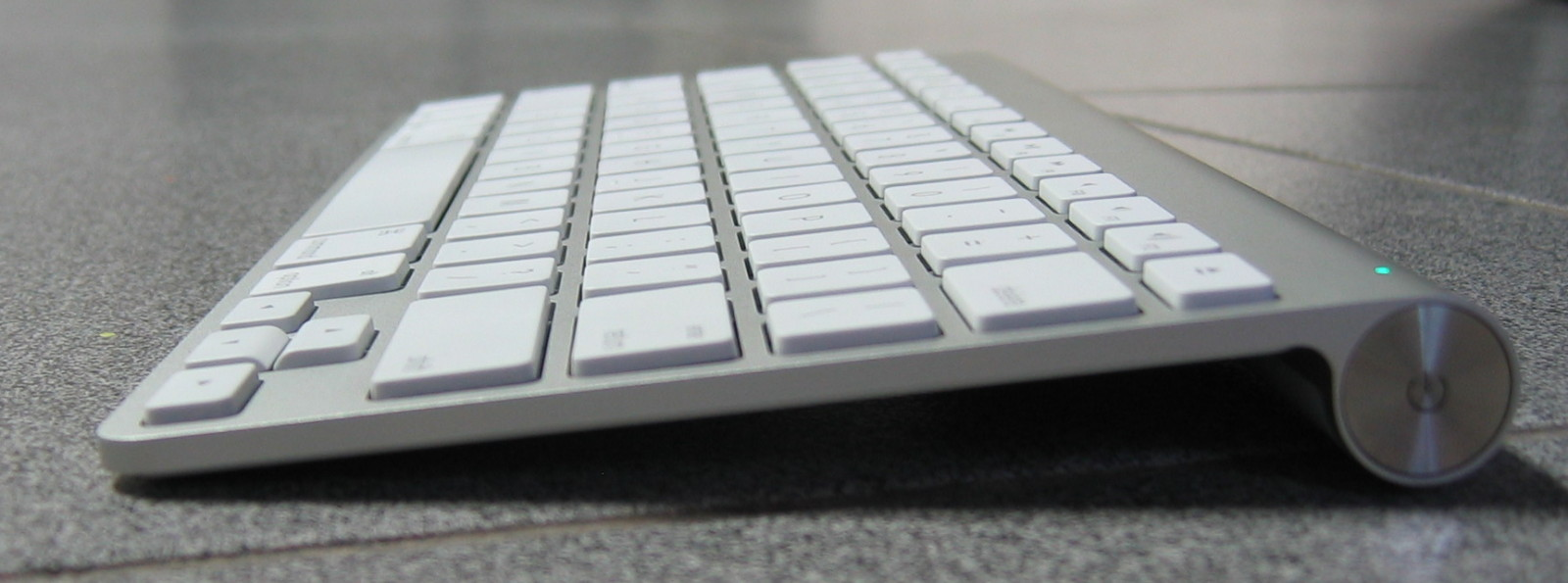
The wireless keyboard matches the Apple Keyboard's slim profile.

On August 7, 2007, Apple released a redesigned model of the Apple Wireless Keyboard. Like the wired Apple Keyboard, the new model is thinner than its predecessors and has an aluminum enclosure. Another addition was the new functions added to the function keys, such as media controls and Dashboard control. Unlike the previous version, the Wireless Keyboard now has a layout similar to the MacBook. The power button has been relocated to the right side of the keyboard, and the layout does not include a numeric keypad. This model added accidental caps lock prevention: the key has to be held down for a moment for the caps lock to engage. This keyboard required only three AA batteries, one fewer than its predecessor.

=== Third generation (A1314) MC184LL/A (2 batteries) ===
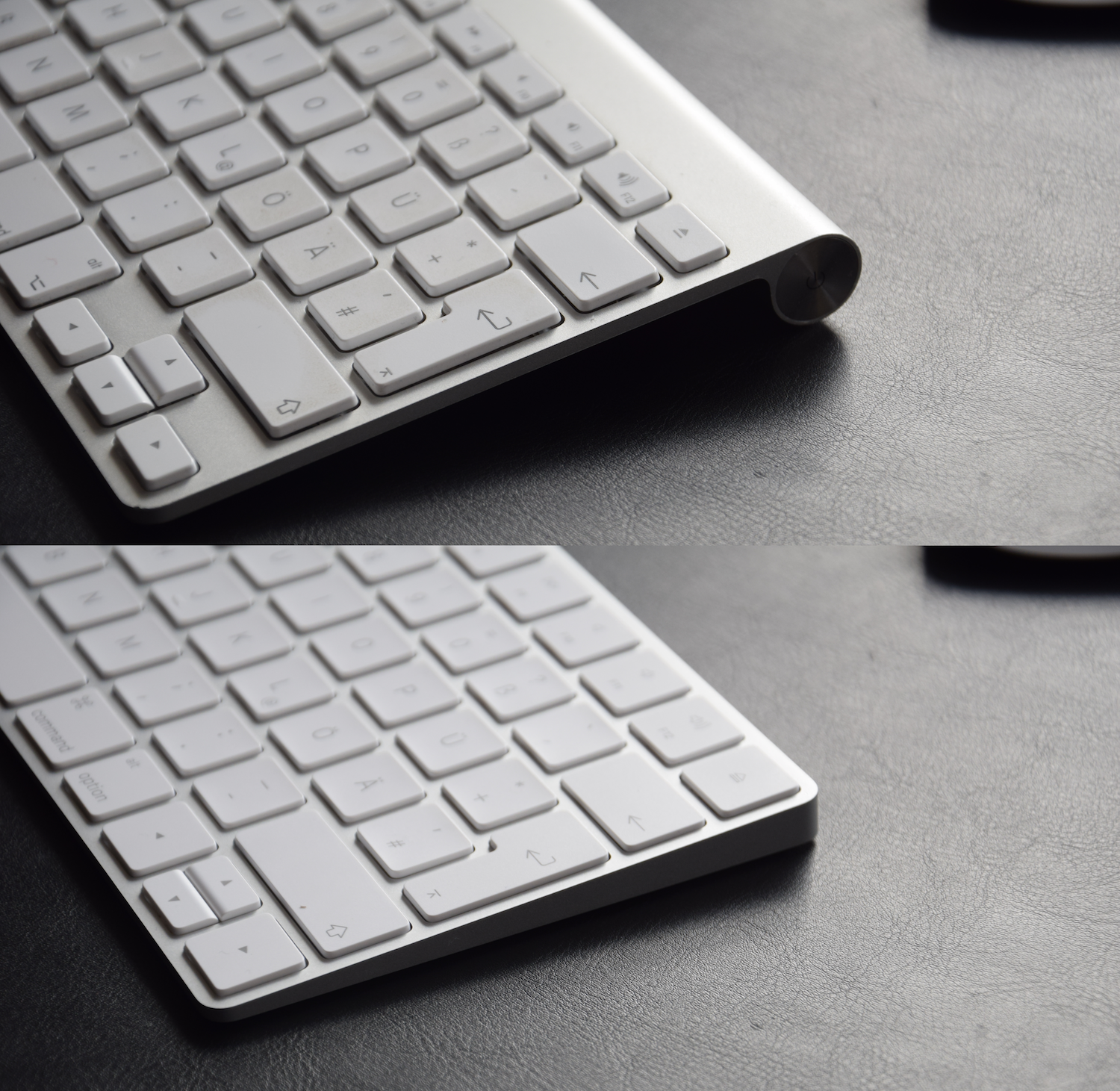
German Apple Wireless Keyboards 2nd generation (top) and Apple Magic keyboard (bottom)

In October 2009, a slightly revised third model was released. New model number A1314 replaced the A1255, two years and two months after the initial release. The new model now uses only two AA batteries instead of three originally. Additionally, Mac OS X 10.5.8 is now the minimum OS over the original Mac OS X 10.4.10. This model of keyboard became standard with new generation of iMacs introduced on the same day. Unfortunately, a firmware update issued in early 2012 rendered the F1 through F9 keys and their associated brightness, Exposé, Dashboard, and media controls inoperable, as well as the right shift key. There is no known fix for this issue.

=== Fourth generation (A1314) MC184LL/B (chargeable/2 batteries) ===
On July 20, 2011, following the release of Mac OS X 10.7/OS X Lion, Apple updated the keyboard slightly, updating the label on the Exposé key to Mission Control and changing the Dashboard key to a Launchpad key.

== Languages and layouts ==
Keyboard layouts with a rectangular Enter key are available in American English and Korean.

Keyboard layouts with L-shaped Enter keys are available in:

- Arabic
- Belgian
- Croatian
- Czech
- Danish
- Dutch
- English (International)
- English (British)
- French
- German
- Greek
- Hebrew
- Hungarian
- Italian
- Norwegian
- Polish
- Portuguese
- Romanian
- Russian
- Slovak
- Slovenian
- Spanish
- Swedish
- Swiss
- Turkish F/Q

== Boot Camp keyboard mapping in Windows ==
Due to the missing keys for Windows PCs (such as the PrintScreen Key), Apple has made keyboard mappings.

Windows keyboard	Equivalent	On older Apple keyboards
PrintScreen	Fn + ⇧ Shift + F11	F13
Scroll Lock	Fn + ⇧ Shift + F12	F14
Pause/Break	Fn + Escape	F15
Home	Fn + ←	
End	Fn + →	
Page Down	Fn + ↓	
Page Up	Fn + ↑	
Forward Delete	Fn + Delete	
Insert	Fn + ↵ Enter	

Note. These keyboard mappings will work on a Mac operating under Windows 7 when running Boot Camp, but may not work if the user selects the Boot Camp option of "Use all F1, F2, etc. keys as standard function keys"

== Non-Apple support ==
Although Apple includes support solely for Macintosh computers, it can also be used on a Microsoft Windows PC providing that a Bluetooth receiver and appropriate Bluetooth stack is installed and properly configured.

The Linux kernel supports Apple Wireless Keyboards via the hid-apple module, which is present in 2.6.x+ kernels.

== See also ==
- Apple Wireless Mouse
- Magic Keyboard (Mac)
- Apple keyboards
- Apple Extended Keyboard
- Magic Trackpad
