= Adapter =

Accessory for adapting or connecting two devices or two workpieces

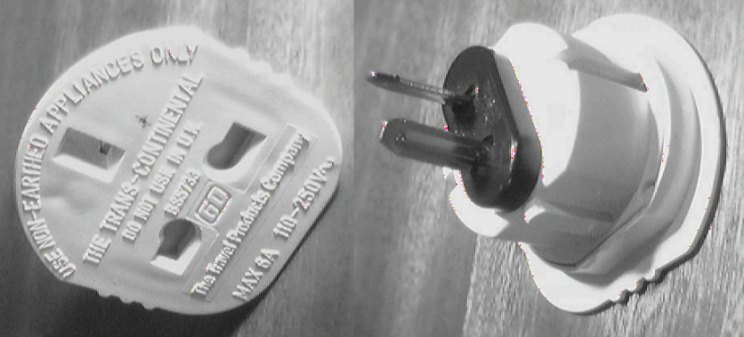
This mains power plug travel adapter allows British plugs to be connected to American or Australian sockets.

An adapter or adaptor is a device that converts attributes of one electrical device or system to those of an otherwise incompatible device or system. Some modify power or signal attributes, while others merely adapt the physical form of one connector to another.

== Travel ==
Many countries with ties to Europe use 230-volt, 50 Hz AC mains electricity, using a variety of power plugs and sockets. Difficulty arises when moving an electrical device between countries that use different sockets. A passive electric power adapter, sometimes called a travel plug or travel adapter, allows using a plug from one region with a foreign socket. As other countries supply 120-volt, 60 Hz AC, using a travel adapter in a country with a different supply poses a safety hazard if the connected device does not support both input voltages.

Plug compatibility and electrical compatibility are separate considerations when using equipment abroad. A travel adapter changes the physical connection between a plug and socket but does not change the supply voltage or frequency. Devices whose power supplies are marked for a broad input range, such as 100–240 V and 50/60 Hz, can generally operate across both major mains-voltage systems with an appropriate plug adapter. Single-voltage appliances may instead require voltage conversion, and differences in mains frequency can also affect some motors, clocks and other frequency-dependent equipment.

== AC-to-DC ==
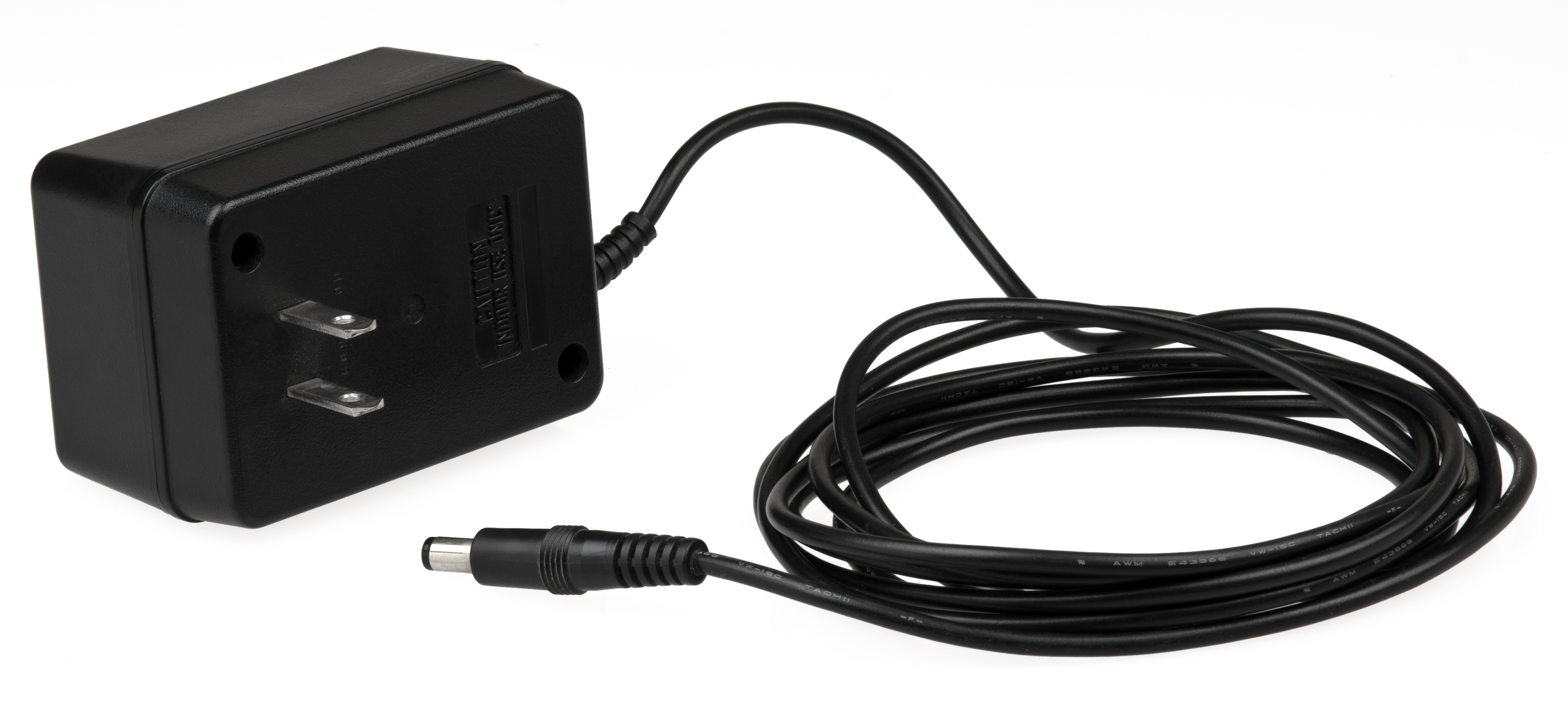
A "power cube"-type AC adapter

An AC-to-DC power supply adapts electricity from household mains voltage (either 120 or 230 volts AC) to low-voltage DC suitable for powering consumer electronics. Small, detached power supplies for consumer electronics are called AC adapters, or variously power bricks, wall warts, or chargers.

== Computer ==
A host controller connects a computer to a peripheral device, such as a storage device, network, or human interface device. As a host controller can also be viewed as bridging the protocols used on the buses between peripheral and computer, and internally to the computer, it is also called a host bus adapter. Likewise, specific types may be called adapters: a network interface controller may be called a network adapter, and a graphics card a display adapter.

Adapters (often in the form of dongles) allow connecting a peripheral device with one plug to a different jack on the computer. They are often used to connect modern devices to a legacy port on an old system, or old devices to a modern port. Such adapters may be entirely passive, or contain active circuitry.

A common type is a USB adapter.

One kind of serial port adapter enables connections between 25-contact and nine-contact connectors, but does not affect electrical power- and signalling-related attributes.

== HDMI ==
HDMI is backward compatible with the single-channel digital video interface (DVI-D or DVI-I, but not DVI-A or dual-channel DVI). When using an adapter or an asymmetric cable, no signal conversion is required, so video quality is not lost. “This means that DVI can be connected to an HDMI input using an adapter. DVI was an important step forward, introducing digital video. But it did not transmit audio. A separate cable to the audio output on the computer or sound card was required for that. Any DVI-HDMI adapter can function as an HDMI-DVI adapter (and vice versa). Usually, the only limitation is the gender of the adapter connectors, as well as the gender of cables and connectors with which it is used.

Features characteristic of HDMI, such as remote control and audio transmission, are not available on devices using the legacy DVI-D signal. However, many devices output HDMI via a DVI connector (for example, ATI 3000 series and NVIDIA GTX 200 graphics cards), and some multimedia displays can accept HDMI (including audio) through a DVI input. The exact capabilities beyond basic compatibility may vary. Adapters are generally bidirectional.

Adapters and active converters are also available for connecting HDMI to other video interfaces, including older analog formats as well as digital formats such as DisplayPort. Introduced in the 2000s, DisplayPort was designed to replace older standards such as VGA, DVI, and FPD-Link. Although it is not directly compatible with these formats, adapters are available for connecting to HDMI, DVI, VGA, and other interfaces. There are USB-CEC adapters that allow a computer to control devices supporting Consumer Electronics Control.

== Software adapters ==
In software, an adapter is a piece of code that complies with an interface of an existing component while actually using another implementation.

== See also ==
- Dongle (includes all sorts of adapters)
- Europlug
- Power strip
- Repurposing
