= Legacy-free PC =

Type of personal computer

A legacy-free PC is a type of personal computer that lacks a floppy or optical disc drive, legacy ports, and an Industry Standard Architecture (ISA) bus (or sometimes, any internal expansion bus at all). According to Microsoft, "The basic goal for these requirements is that the operating system, devices, and end users cannot detect the presence of the following: ISA slots or devices; legacy floppy disk controller (FDC); and PS/2, serial, parallel, and game ports." The legacy ports are usually replaced with Universal Serial Bus (USB) ports. A USB adapter may be used if an older device must be connected to a PC lacking these ports. According to the 2001 edition of Microsoft's PC System Design Guide, a legacy-free PC must be able to boot from a USB device.

Removing older, usually bulkier ports and devices allows a legacy-free PC to be much more compact than earlier systems and many fall into the nettop or all-in-one form factor. Netbooks and ultrabooks could also be considered a portable form of a legacy-free PC. Legacy-free PCs can be more difficult to upgrade than a traditional beige box PC, and are more typically expected to be replaced completely when they become obsolete. Many legacy-free PCs include modern devices that may be used to replace ones omitted, such as a memory card reader replacing the floppy drive.

As the first decade of the 21st century progressed, the legacy-free PC went mainstream, with legacy ports removed from commonly available computer systems in all form factors. However, the PS/2 keyboard connector still retains some use, as it can offer some uses (e.g. implementation of n-key rollover) not offered by USB.

With those parts becoming increasingly rare on newer computers as of the late 2010s and early 2020s, the term "legacy-free PC" itself has also become increasingly rare.

== History ==
=== Late 1980s ===
In 1987, IBM released the IBM PS/2 line with new internal architecture; the BIOS and the new PS/2 port and VGA port was introduced, but this line was heavily criticized for a relatively closed proprietary architecture and low compatibility with PC-cloned hardware.

=== 1990s ===
In 1998, Apple's iMac G3 was introduced as the first widely known example of a legacy-free PC, and drew much criticism for its lack of legacy peripherals such as a floppy drive and Apple Desktop Bus (ADB) connector; However, its success popularized USB ports.

Compaq released the iPaq desktop in 1999. In the same year, AMD introduced the Easy Now, a reference design for a PC without legacy hardware, relying on USB and CD-ROM.

From November 1999 to July 2000, Dell's WebPC was an early less-successful Wintel legacy-free PC.

=== 2000s ===
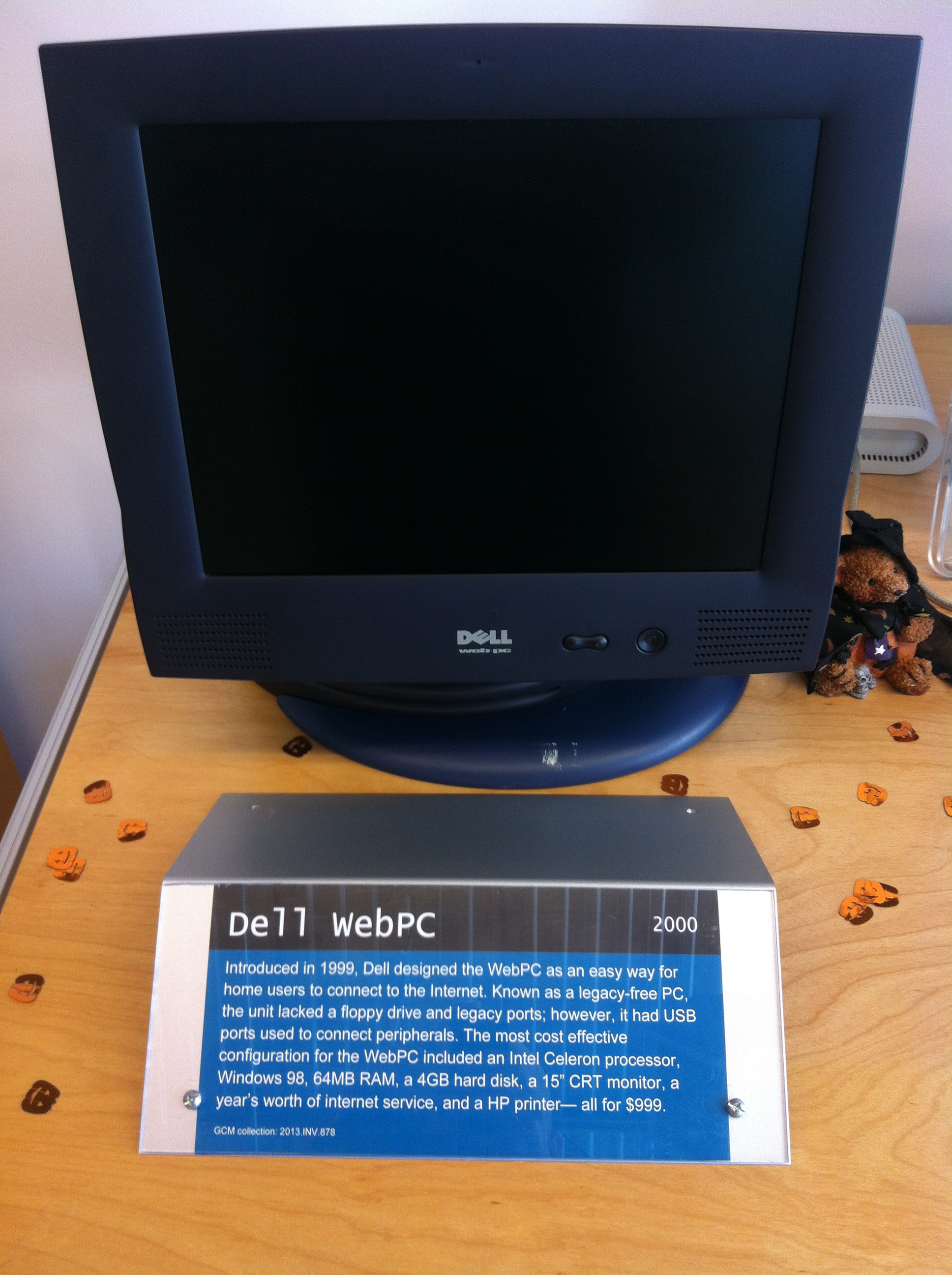
Dell WebPC, released in 2000

More legacy-free PCs were introduced around 2000 after the prevalence of USB and broadband internet made many of the older ports and devices obsolete. They largely took the form of low-end, consumer systems with the motivation of making computers less expensive, easier to use, and more stable and manageable. The Dell Studio Hybrid, Asus Eee Box and MSI Wind PC are examples of later, more-successful Intel-based legacy-free PCs.

Apple introduced the Apple Modem on October 12, 2005 and removed the internal 56K modem on new computers. The MacBook Air, introduced on January 29, 2008, also omits a built-in SuperDrive and wired Ethernet connectivity that was available on all other Mac computers sold at the time. The SuperDrive would later be removed from all Macs by the end of 2016, and wired Ethernet would later be removed from all MacBook models. These removals were followed by other PC manufacturers who ship lightweight laptops.

Intel introduced their LGA 775 CPU socket in 2004, replacing their previous CPUs and sockets with PGA packaging.

=== 2010s ===
Northbridge, southbridge, and FSB have been replaced by more integrated architectures starting from early 2010s.

The relaunched MacBook in 2015 dropped features such as the MagSafe charging port and the Secure Digital (SD) memory card reader. It only kept two types of ports: a 3.5 mm audio jack and a USB 3.1 Type-C port. This configuration later found its way in the MacBook Pro in 2016, the only difference being that two or four Thunderbolt 3 ports were included instead of just one. In addition, all MacBook Pro except for the entry-level model replaced the function keys with a Touch Bar. These changes led to criticism because many users used the features that Apple had removed, yet this approach has been copied to various degree by some other laptop vendors. However, the 2021 MacBook Pro models once again include function keys, magsafe, an HDMI port, an SD card reader, and do not feature a Touch Bar, seemingly in response to the aforementioned poor reception.

The legacy BIOS was replaced by the Unified Extensible Firmware Interface. PCI has fallen out of favor, as it has been superseded by PCIe.

ChromeOS can be considered a "legacy free" operating system by some.

=== 2020s ===
In the 2020s, more legacy ports were removed by most PC manufacturers.

Most motherboards for the Intel 800 series chipset or AMD 800 series chipset removed PS/2 ports. Most motherboards for the Intel 800 series chipset also removed legacy BIOS support (via CSM) as well as DDR4 support, solely supporting DDR5 only.

Most laptop manufacturers no longer ship computers with USB-A ports in favor of USB-C. As of 2026, the Mac Studio is the only device made by Apple still having USB-A ports.

== See also ==
- Nettop
- Netbook
- PC 2001
- WebPC
- iPAQ (desktop computer)
- Network computer
- Thin client
- Legacy system
