= WebPC =

1999 Dell budget PC

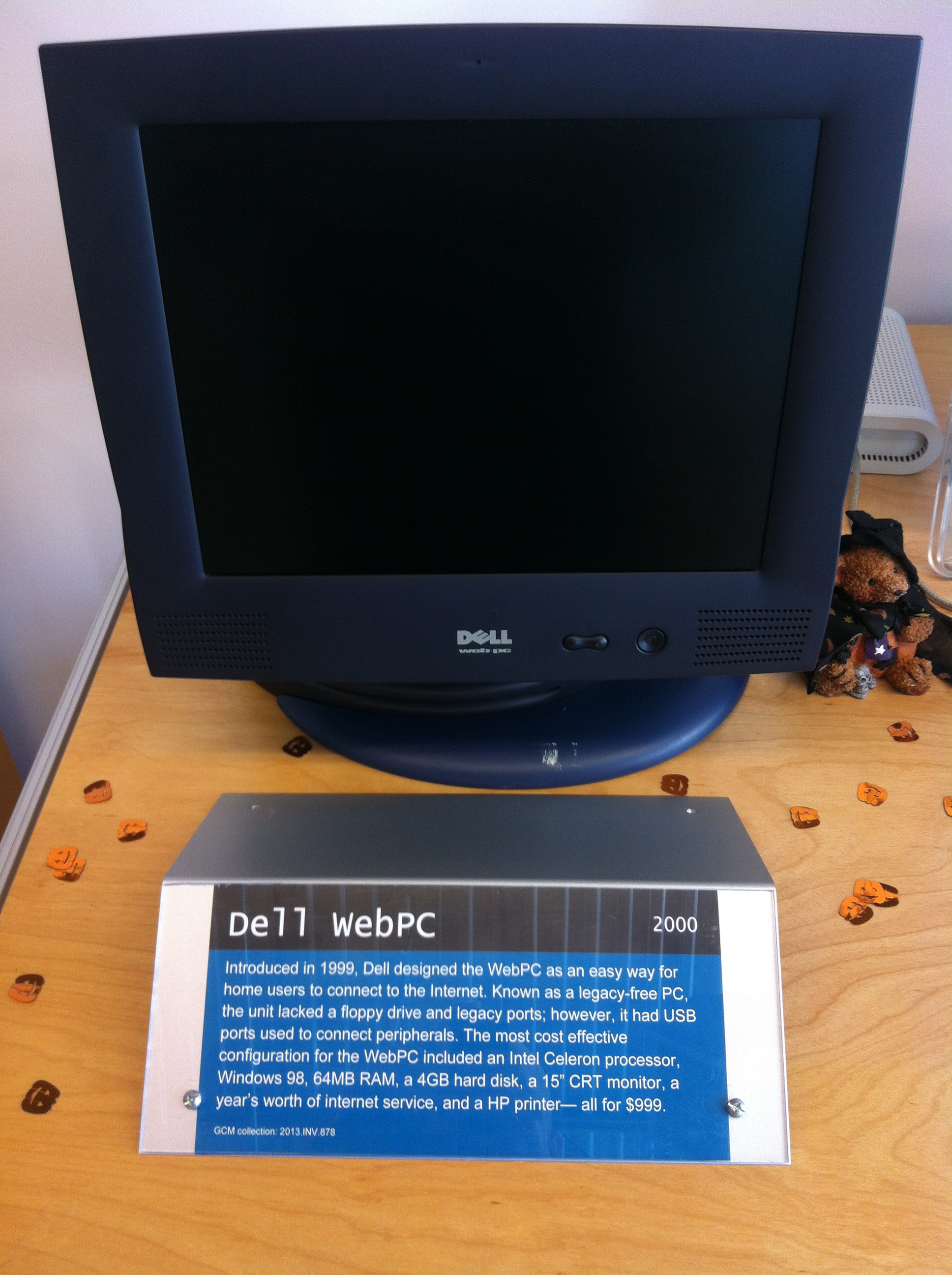
Dell WebPC

The WebPC was a short-lived personal computer designed by Dell Computer for the consumer market. The computer was designed to make it easy for home users to connect to the Internet. A small form factor machine, the WebPC was an early system in a class known as legacy-free PCs.

== Specifications and price ==
The system was originally introduced in 1999. Available in prices ranging from $999 through $2,399 USD. Its cheapest configuration was a 433-MHz Intel Celeron processor, Microsoft Windows 98, 64 MB of system RAM, a 4 GB hard disk, a 15-inch CRT monitor, a year's worth of Internet service and a Hewlett-Packard printer for $999 USD. In a move remotely mimicking the iMac, Dell also offered the WebPC in different colors, however the colors only were accents on the case; the majority of the case remained black.

In 2000, Dell offered upgraded models of the WebPC, featuring processors up to a Pentium III at 600 MHz, 10/100 Ethernet built in (previous models included only a 56K modem), a bundled flat panel display, and larger hard disks up to 20 GB.

The system's case was extremely compact. The CD-ROM or DVD-ROM drive was a laptop-type unit with a custom bezel, but its internal IDE hard disk drive was a standard 3.5" drive.The system also made use of Mini PCI, another standard typically found on laptop computers, for its communications card. It did however use standard SDRAM modules for memory. The case measured only 6 inches wide, 10.7 inches high, 10.1 inches deep and weighed a maximum of about 12 pounds. It also featured a unique "e-support" button that caused the computer to run diagnostic tests and also allowed quick access to online technical support.

== Discontinuation ==
In July 2000, Dell discontinued production of the WebPC. WebPC computers are rarely seen today, however they have been known to appear on eBay.

== See also ==
Dell SmartStep 100D

- Dell WebPC Press Kit at dell.com
