= IPAQ (desktop computer) =

Desktop computer

iPAQ Desktop Personal Computer
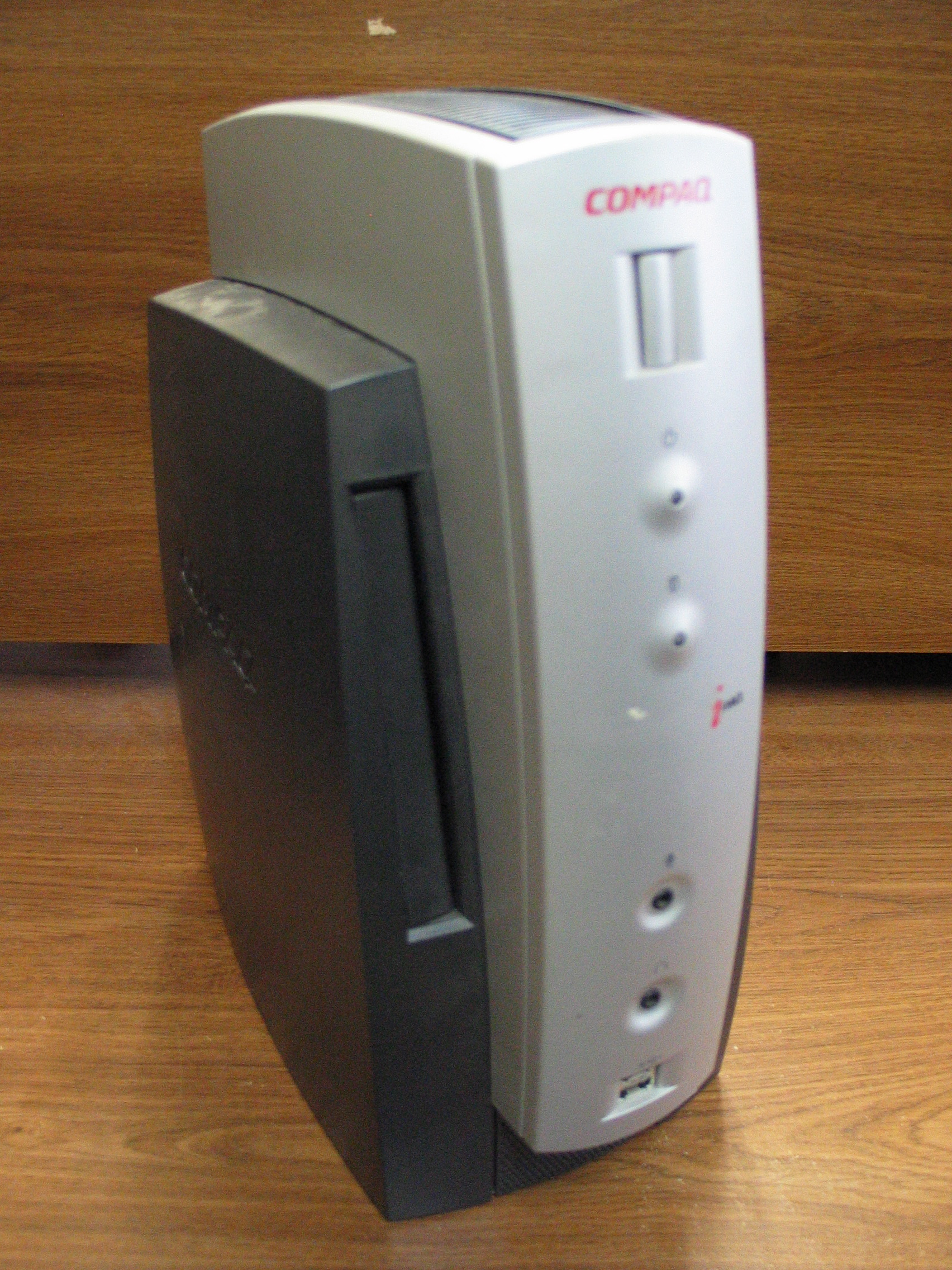
- iPaq Desktop Front
- Developer: Compaq
- Type: desktop
- Released: 1999
- Related: Compaq iPAQ brand

The iPAQ Desktop Personal Computer in its various incarnations was a legacy-free PC produced by the Compaq Computer Corporation around the year 2000.

It was inspired by the iMac, and was primarily designed to be a portable desktop computer that could be used as a simple internet-capable computer.

== Hardware ==
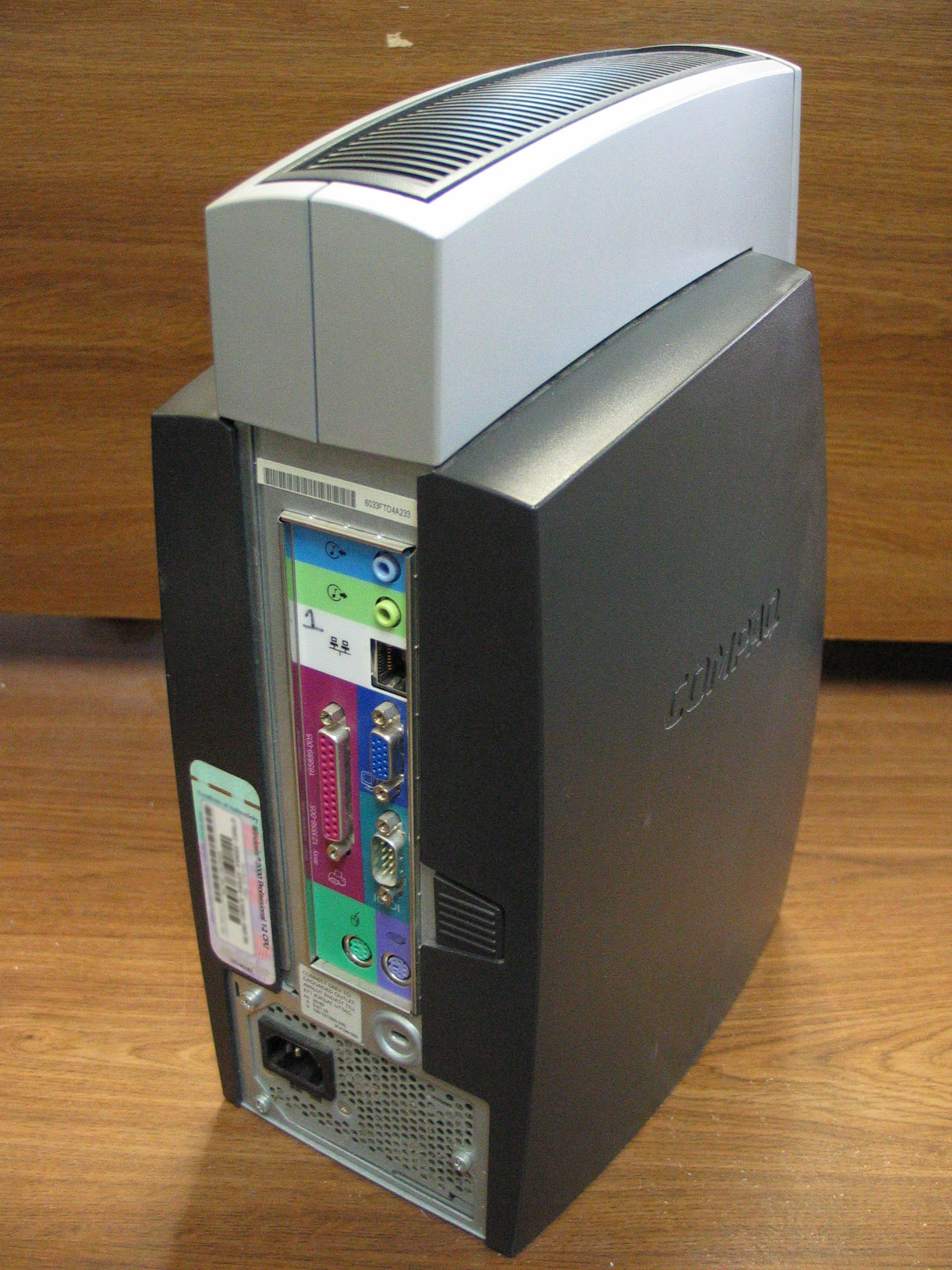
iPaq Desktop Legacy Rear

The iPAQ had very few limitations on upgradability; hard drives, RAM, CPU and 'Multi-Bay' drives can be readily interchanged, although the iPAQ did not contain sockets for expansion cards.

It featured an interchangeable 'Multi-Bay' slot that could accept a 3.5 inch LS SuperDisk drive (the only way to read a floppy disk - standard Multi-Bay floppy drives do not work), optical drives, or a secondary hard disk device. The slot was the same as those found on many Compaq Armada and many other HP/Compaq laptop computer systems.

By a method of convection for cooling, these computers were commonly found in office environments due to their low noise (dB) output.

The iPAQ ran on either an Intel Pentium III processor or on an Intel Celeron processor; ranging from 500 MHz to 1 GHz processor in a PGA370 socket.

The internal RAM was upgradable to 512 MB of 100 MHz 168-pin SDR SDRAM. Due to the RAM limit of the Intel 815 series chipset, the BIOS in the iPAQ prevents the system from booting if there is more than 512 MB installed, instructing the user to decrease the amount of RAM in the system to no more than 512 MB.

The first version came in two different models, "Legacy free" which had no parallel, serial, or PS/2 ports and instead 3 additional USB ports on the back; and the traditional one which included the parallel, serial, and PS/2 ports but only had USB ports on the front. The second version had different styling and had a backpack which added the "legacy" ports.

iPAQ Desktops were typically sold with Windows 98 or Windows 2000 already installed. They are easily upgraded to Windows XP and can also technically run Windows Vista and Windows 7 despite the low RAM limit. In the case of Windows 7, the only way to utilize the onboard video chip is to install the Intel815 Windows XP Drivers.

== Internet appliance ==
For a short time, around the year 2000, Compaq released a few models of an iPAQ that functioned as internet appliances. They did not have a CD-ROM drive and offered very few ports to connect to for very basic use.

There were two variants of the flat-panel iPAQs, a common Windows CE-based version in a white case, and the less common blue version known as the 'Clipper'.

The Windows CE version was sometimes called the 'MSN Messenger version' and worked exclusively with the Microsoft Network over a dial-up connection using the Windows CE version of Internet Explorer.

The Clipper appeared to be designed more for commercial environments and used a compact operating system based on BeOS called BeIA. The built-in "Wagner" web browser application was a customized version of the Opera browser.

The Clipper also included a standard 10BASE-T Ethernet port, and shipped with the ability for the end-user to access the command line in order to tailor the device to use a company logo on the start-up screen. It also included a Minitel client for use where Minitel was available (mainly Canada and France).
