= Hockey puck mouse =

Mouse by Apple Inc

Apple USB Mouse (M4848)
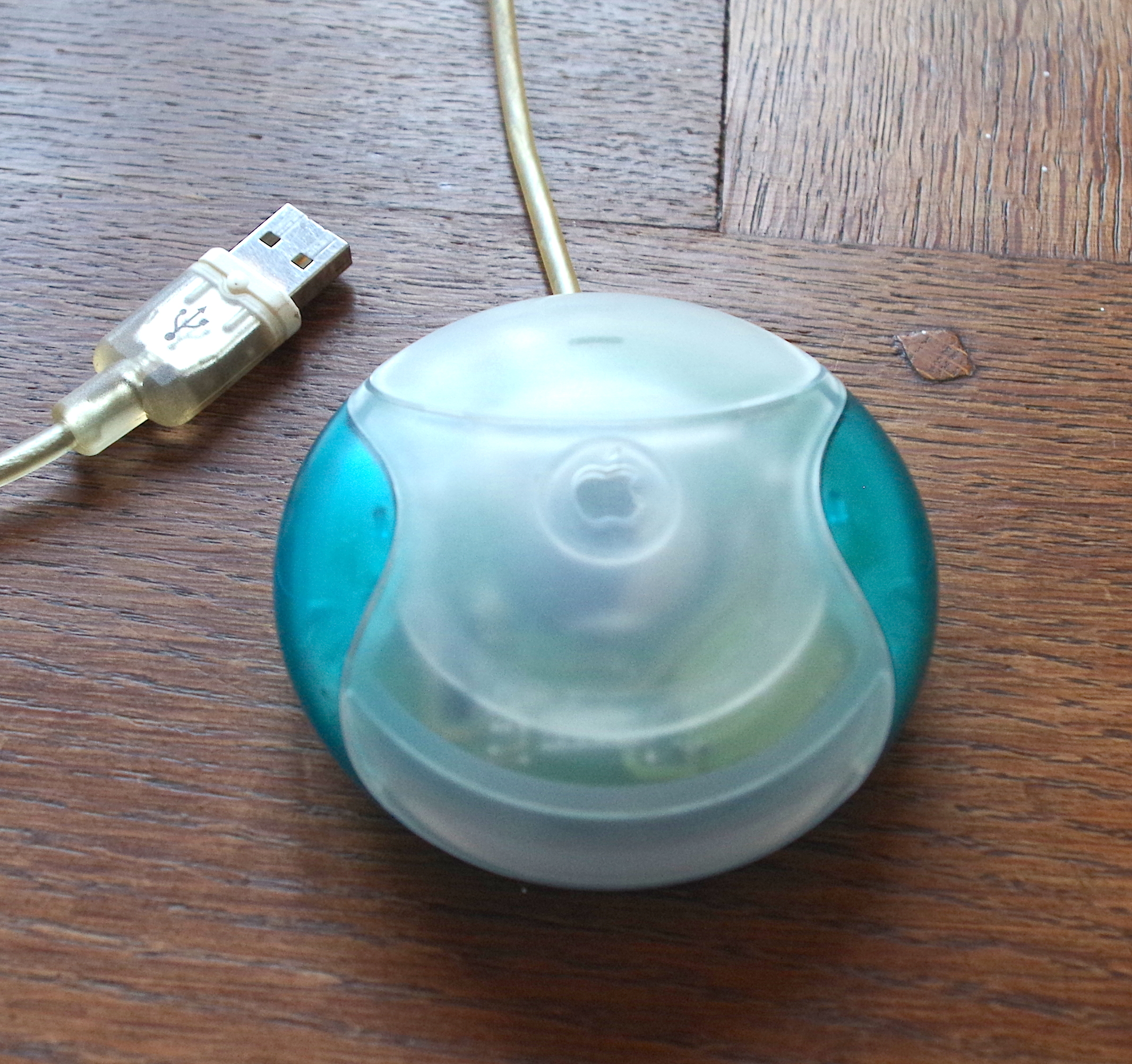
- Classic Bondi Blue Apple USB Mouse
- Developer: Apple Computer, Inc.
- Manufacturer: Logitech
- Type: Mouse
- Released: August 15, 1998
- Discontinued: July 2000
- Predecessor: Apple Desktop Bus Mouse 2
- Successor: Apple Pro Mouse (Black)
- Website: apple.com

The Apple USB Mouse (model number M4848), commonly called the "Hockey Puck" because of its unusually circular shape, is a mouse released by Apple Computer, Inc. It was first released with the Bondi Blue iMac G3 in 1998 and included with all successive desktop Macs for the next two years. It was the first commercially released Apple mouse to use the USB connection format and not the Apple Desktop Bus (ADB). Many reviewers criticized the mouse for its design; in 2008, Bryan Gardiner of Wired deemed the mouse to be among "Apple's most notorious flops".

== Design and criticism ==
Unlike the Mouse II that preceded it, the "hockey puck" mouse has a circular shape; it has a single mouse button located at the top, like previous Apple mice. The mouse's round shape is widely considered clumsy, due to its small size and tendency to rotate in use. A slightly improved later version had an indentation on its button showing where to press. This was a major cause for the success of the Griffin iMate ADB to USB adapters, as they allowed the older, more comfortable ADB Mouse II to be used with those iMacs. There were some products like the iCatch, a shell that attached to the USB mouse to give it the ADB mouse's elliptical shape.

Another flaw introduced in the Apple USB Mouse, shared across all of Apple's USB offerings, is the atypically short cord. Though intended for use through the integrated hub in Apple's keyboards, Apple's transition to USB coincided with the relocation of ports on their notebooks from the center to the left edge.

== Legacy ==
In 2000, the Apple USB Mouse was replaced with the Apple Pro Mouse.

== Available colors ==
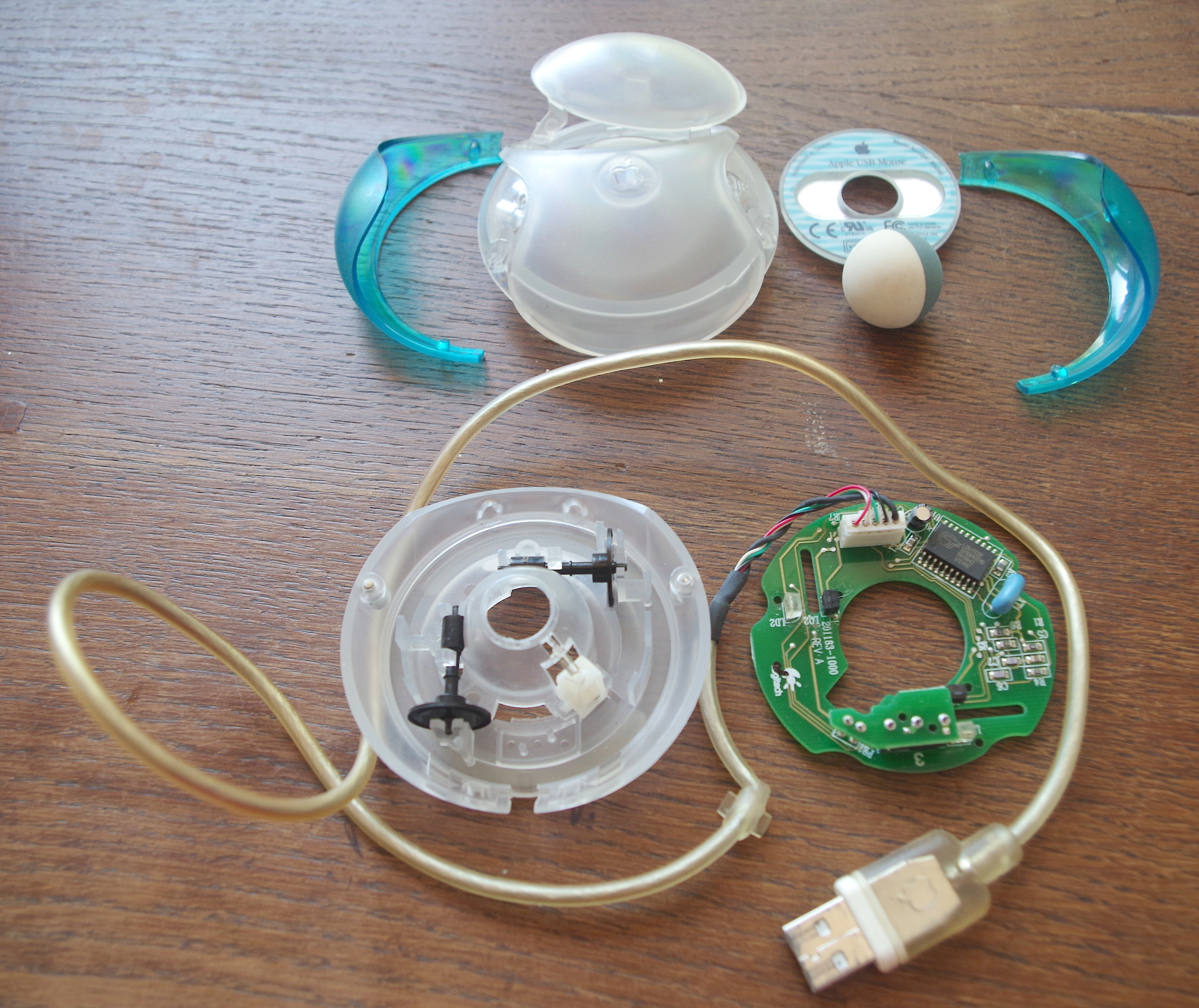
Disassembled Bondi Blue USB mouse

Color	Released with
Bondi Blue	iMac G3
Blueberry	iMac G3 and Power Mac G3 Blue and White
Strawberry	iMac G3
Grape	iMac G3
Lime	iMac G3
Tangerine	iMac G3
Graphite	iMac G3 DV Special Edition (slot loading) and Power Mac G4 Yikes and Sawtooth
