= SmartStep 100D =

Series of personal computers sold by Dell

The Dell SmartStep 100D was a short-lived personal computer sold by Dell from 2001 to 2002 for the consumer market. The SmartStep 100D was designed to make it easy for home users to connect to the internet. The computer sold for a fixed low price, with a fixed configuration (the customer couldn't purchase additional memory or a larger hard drive). The computer was manufactured by MiTAC, which also built computers for Compaq and Hewlett-Packard. The SmartStep 100D shipped in a case similar to the Dell Dimension systems of the era, but with a blue faceplate instead of black. The SmartStep 100D was Dell's lowest-cost computer, with a starting price of $599 with a 90-day warranty, or a one-year warranty for $50 more. It was equipped with a 1 Ghz Intel Celeron, 128 MB of RAM (can be expanded by end user up to 512 MB), and a 20GB HDD. The computer also included a built-in dial-up modem. It was designed to compete with off-the-shelf computers sold in retail stores made by companies such as EMachines. The SmartStep 100D also included a 15-inch monitor, keyboard, and speakers, along with 6 months of AOL internet service. The SmartStep was a successor to the also-short-lived WebPC, which was discontinued after less than a year due to poor sales. The SmartStep 100D ran Windows XP Home Edition. The Dell SmartStep line was discontinued after ten months. It was replaced with a version of the Dell Dimension 2300, called the 2300LE. The SmartStep line was sold in Asia under the SmartPC Brand.

Desktop Models
Model	Processor	RAM	Storage
SmartStep 100D	1 GHz Celeron	128 MB	20 GB HDD

== See also ==
WebPC
