= Legacy port =

Antiquated computer port

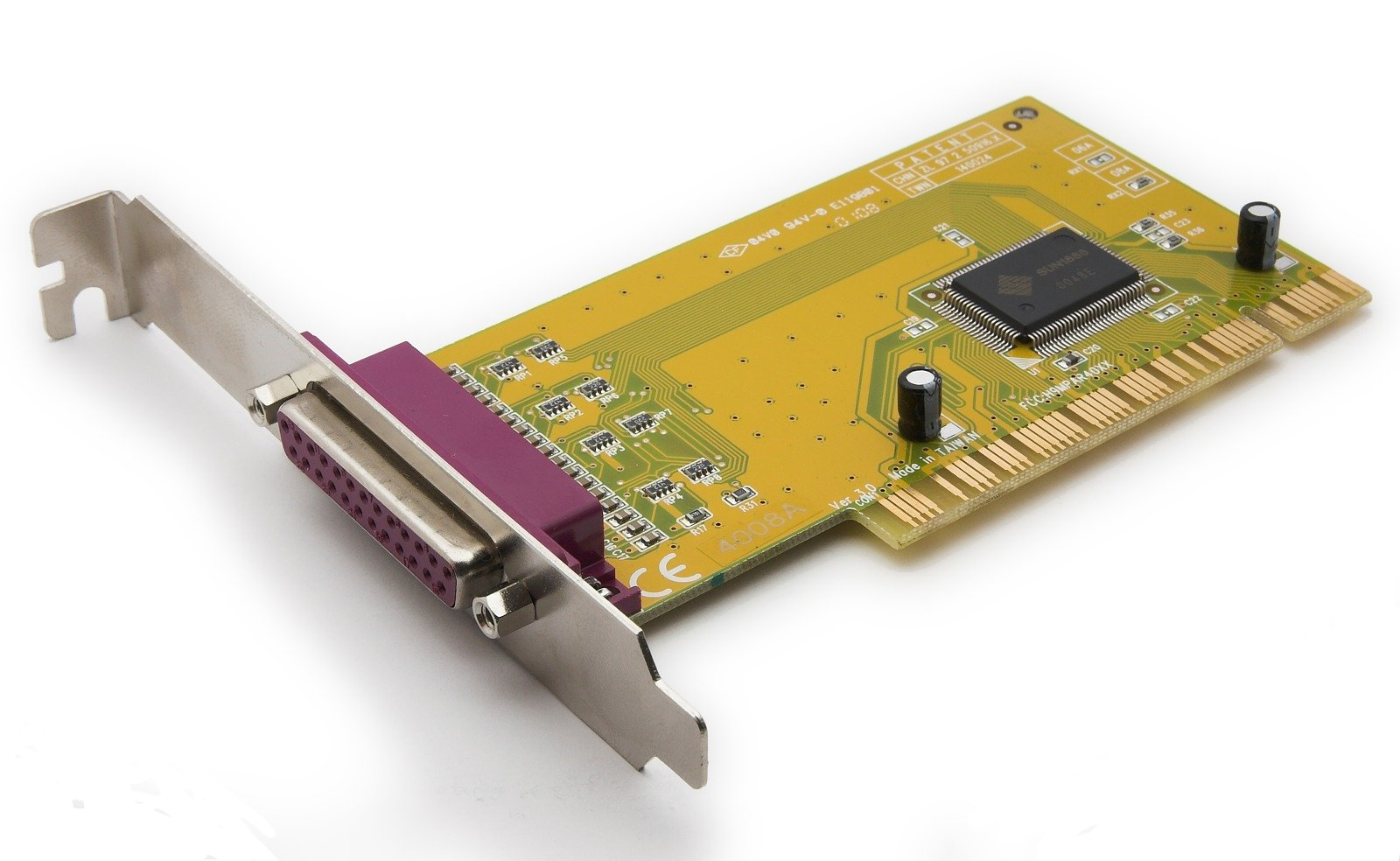
A parallel port implemented as a PCI card. Users can use expansion cards to add deprecated legacy ports to newer computer systems that do not provide them.

In computing, a legacy port is a computer port or connector that is considered by some to be fully or partially superseded. The replacement ports usually provide most of the functionality of the legacy ports with higher speeds, more compact design, or plug and play and hot swap capabilities for greater ease of use. Modern PC motherboards use separate Super I/O controllers to provide legacy ports, since current chipsets do not offer direct support for them. A category of computers called legacy-free PCs omits these ports, typically retaining only USB for external expansion.

USB adapters are often used to provide legacy ports if they are required on systems not equipped with them.

== Common legacy ports ==
Legacy port	Typical appearance	Typical uses	Replacement(s)
Centronics port, parallel port	A parallel port	Printer, scanner, removable media	USB, Wi-Fi, Ethernet
External parallel SCSI	A parallel SCSI port	Removable media	USB, Thunderbolt, Serial Attached SCSI
AT connector / DIN	A device-side AT (DIN 41524) connector	Keyboard	USB
Serial port / RS-232	An RS-232 serial port	Console, modem, mouse	USB
Game port / DA-15	A DA-15 game port	MIDI, gaming devices such as joysticks	USB
PS/2 port / 6-pin mini-DIN	A selection of mini-DIN F ports, in this example used for mouse and keyboard	Keyboard, mouse	USB
Apple Desktop Bus / mini-DIN	A selection of mini-DIN F ports, in this example used for mouse and keyboard	Low speed external peripherals; such as keyboard, mouse, or joystick	USB
LocalTalk / mini-DIN	A selection of mini-DIN F ports, in this example used for mouse and keyboard	OldWorld Macintosh printer and LAN	USB, Wi-Fi, Ethernet
Bus Industry Standard Architecture (ISA)	ISA ports on a motherboard	Connect peripheral cards to motherboard	PCI, PCI Express
VGA / DE-15	A DE-15 SVGA port	Display connector	DVI, HDMI, DisplayPort
Parallel ATA	A parallel ATA port on a hard disk drive	Internal hard drives, CD-ROM	Serial ATA, M.2
Floppy drive connector	A floppy drive connector on a floppy disk drive	Floppy drives, tape drives	USB
IEEE 1394 (FireWire)	Two firewire ports on a PCI expansion card	Video devices, external storage	USB 3.0, Thunderbolt
Accelerated Graphics Port	An AGP port, with ruler for scale	Graphics card	PCI Express
PC Card	A pair of PC card devices, showing the connector	Laptop storage cards, other peripherals	ExpressCard, USB

== See also ==
- Legacy encoding
- Legacy system
