= PC System Design Guide =

Series of hardware design requirements and recommendations

The PC System Design Guide (also known as the PC-97, PC-98, PC-99, or PC 2001 specification) is a series of hardware design requirements and recommendations for IBM PC compatible personal computers, compiled by Microsoft and Intel Corporation during 1997–2001. They were aimed at helping manufacturers provide hardware that made the best use of the capabilities of the Microsoft Windows operating system, and to simplify setup and use of such computers.

Every part of a standard computer and the most common kinds of peripheral devices are defined with specific requirements. Systems and devices that meet the specification should be automatically recognized and configured by the operating system.

== Versions ==
Four versions of the PC System Design Guide were released. The book Hardware Design Guide for Microsoft Windows 95 was a predecessor to the PC System Design Guide. Unlike the PC System Design Guide, Hardware Design Guide for Microsoft Windows 95 only focused IBM PC Compatables and Windows 95. In PC-97, a distinction was made between the requirements of a Basic PC, a Workstation PC and an Entertainment PC. In PC-98, the Mobile PC was added as a category. In PC 2001, the Entertainment PC was dropped.

Version	Date
Hardware Design Guide for Microsoft Windows 95	October 1, 1994
PC-97	February 9, 1998
PC-98	December 31, 1998
PC-99	July 14, 1999
PC 2001	November 2, 2000

=== Hardware Design Guide for Microsoft Windows 95 ===
Aimed at systems running Windows 95. Required:

- A 386 or compatible microprocessor
- 4 MB RAM
- VGA display
- The ablity to run Windows 3.0 in enhanced mode.

It was published as ISBN 1556156421, 978-1556156427.

=== PC-97 ===
Required:

- 120 MHz Pentium, MIPS R4x00, Digital Alpha 21064 (EV4) or IBM PowerPC architecture (latter three only under Windows NT)
- 16 MB RAM

Initial version.

- Introduced color code for PS/2 keyboard (purple) and PS/2 mouse (green) connectors

=== PC-98 ===
Aimed at systems to be used with Windows 98 or Windows 2000. Required:

- 200 MHz Pentium processor with MMX technology (or equivalent performance)
- 256 KB L2 cache
- 32 MB RAM (recommended: 64 MB of 66 MHz DRAM)
- ACPI 1.0 (including power button behavior)
- Fast BIOS power-up (limited RAM test, no floppy test, minimal startup display, etc.)
- BIOS Y2K compliance
- PXE preboot environment

It was published as ISBN 1-57231-716-7.

=== PC-99 ===
Required:

- 300 MHz CPU
- 64 MB RAM
- USB
- Comprehensive color-coding scheme for ports and connectors (see below)

Strongly discouraged:

- Non plug-and-play hardware
- ISA slots

It was published as ISBN 0-7356-0518-1.

=== PC 2001 ===
Required:

- 667 MHz CPU
- 64 MB RAM

Final version. First to require IO-APICs to be enabled on all desktop systems. Places a greatly increased emphasis on legacy-reduced and legacy-free systems. Some "legacy" items such as ISA expansion slots and device dependence on MS-DOS are forbidden entirely, while others are merely strongly discouraged.

PC 2001 removes compatibility for the A20 line: "If A20M# generation logic is still present in the system, this logic must be terminated such that software writes to I/O port 92, bit 1, do not result in A20M# being asserted to the processor."

== Color-coding scheme for connectors and ports ==
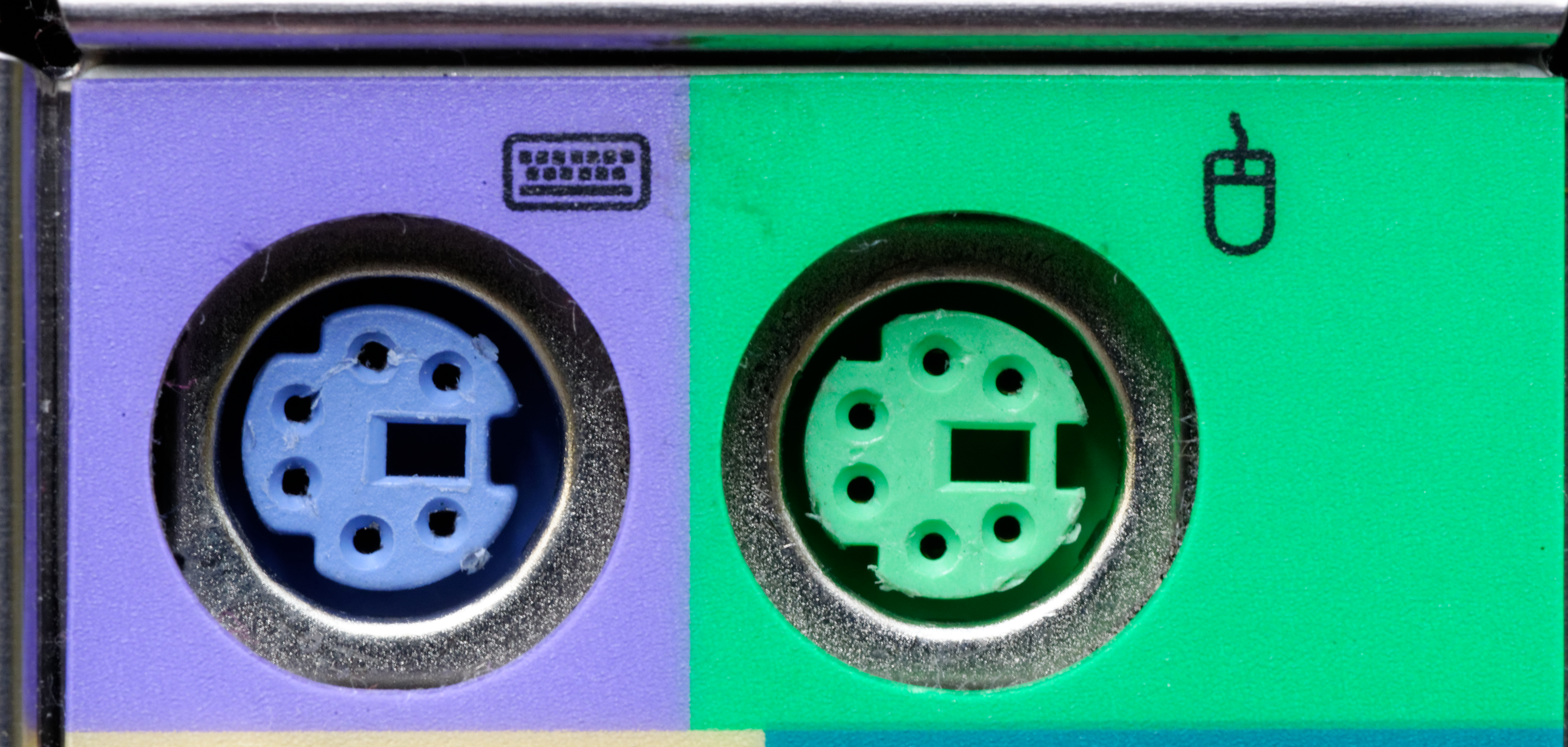
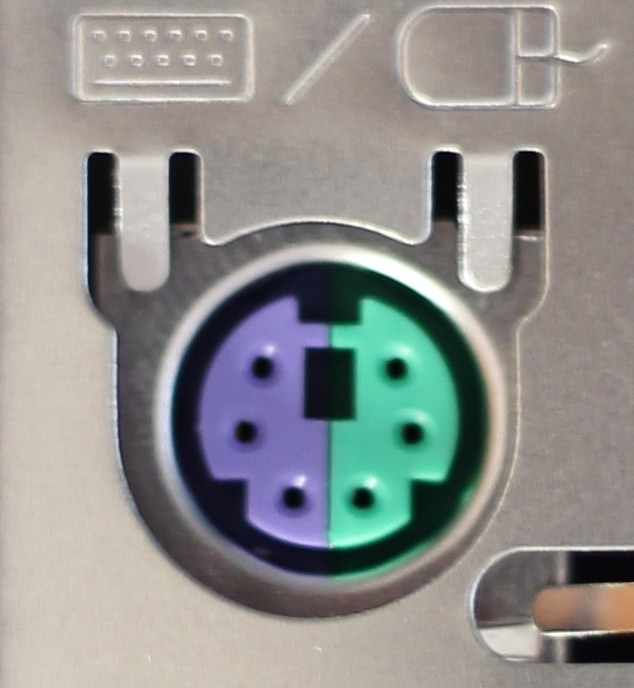
Color-coded PS/2 ports and PS/2 dualport
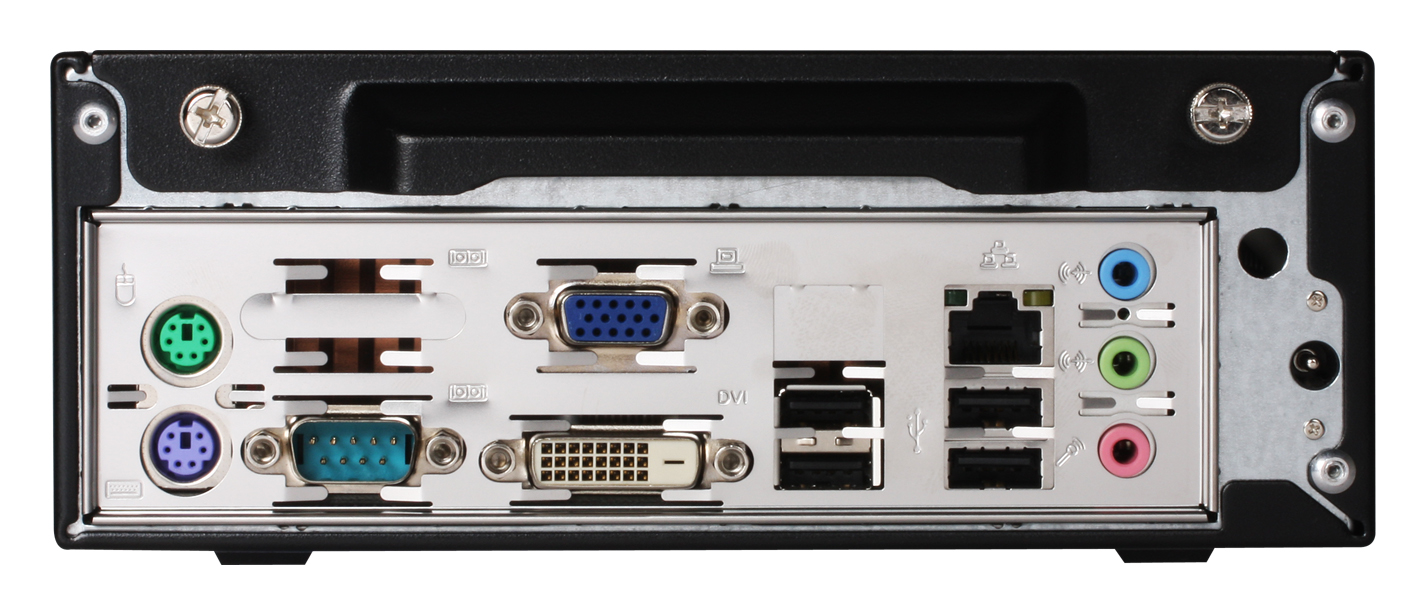
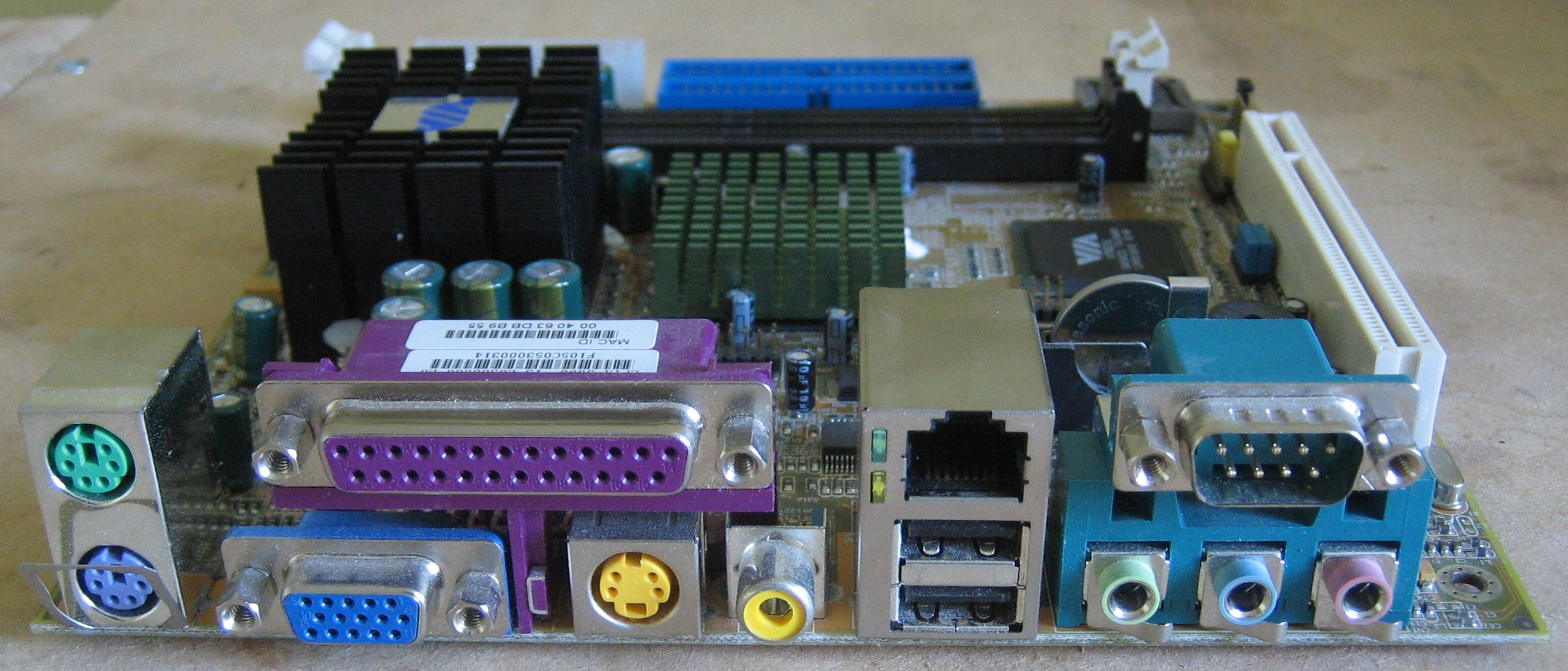
Color-coded motherboard ATX connectors

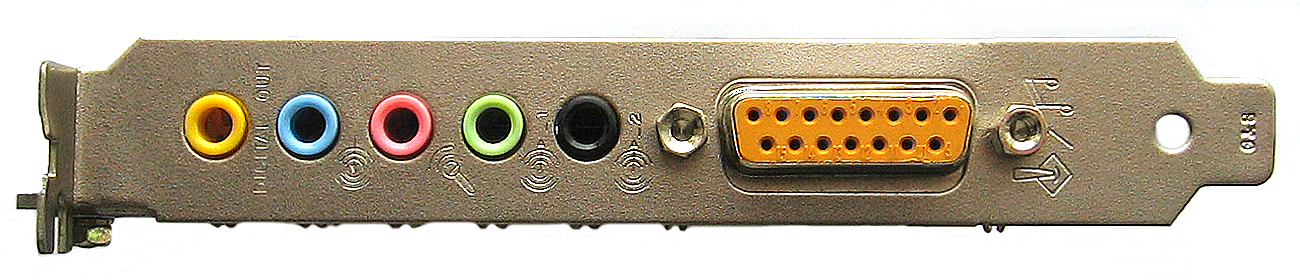
Color coded sound card connector on a Sound Blaster

A simple block diagram on how to wire a basic computer stereo setup according to the PC System Design Guide.

Perhaps the most end-user visible and lasting impact of PC 99 was that it introduced a color code for the various standard types of plugs and connectors used on PCs. As many of the connectors look similar, particularly to a novice PC user, this provided another visual aid to make it easier for people to connect peripherals to the correct ports on a PC. This color code was gradually adopted by almost all PC and motherboard manufacturers. Some of the color codes have also been widely adopted by peripheral manufacturers.

Unofficial extensions

Color / Pantone value	Function	Connector on PC
Mouse and keyboard
Green / 3395C	PS/2 mouse / pointing device	6-pin mini-DIN female
Purple / 2715C	PS/2 keyboard	6-pin mini-DIN female
Gold / 131C	Game port / MIDI	15-pin D female
General input/output
Black / 426C	USB 1.0/1.1/2.0	USB Type A female
Grey / 424C	IEEE 1394 (FireWire)	6-pin FireWire 400
Burgundy / 235C	Parallel port	25-pin D female
Teal or turquoise / 322C	Serial port	9 or 25 pin D male
Black / 426C	High-Definition Multimedia Interface	HDMI female
Video
Blue / 661C	Analog monitor	15-pin VGA female
White	Digital monitor	DVI female
Yellow / 123C	Video out: S-Video	4-pin mini-DIN
Yellow / 123C	Video out: Composite video	RCA jack
Audio
Pink / 701C	Analog microphone audio input (mono or stereo).	3.5 mm TRS
Light blue / 284C	Analog line level audio input.	3.5 mm TRS
Lime green / 577C	Analog line level audio output.	3.5 mm TRS
Orange / 157C	Analog audio output for the center speaker and Subwoofer	3.5 mm TRS
Brown / 4645C	Interconnect cable for "right-to-left" speakers.	3.5 mm TRS
Black / 426C	Analog line-level audio output for surround speakers, typically rear stereo.	3.5 mm TRS
Silver / 422 C	Analog line level audio output for surround optional side stereo.	3.5 mm TRS

== Icons ==
Another long lasting inpact of the PC System Design Guide is that it recommended a set of icons that were created by Microsoft. These icons first appeared in the Hardware Design Guide for Microsoft Windows 95. While the use of these icons were not required, they became de facto standard. This icon set was later officially extended by Hewlett-Packard and unofficially others.

Hewlett-Packard's official extensions Unofficial extensions IEC 60417, unrelated to the PC System Design Guide

Icon	Function	Connector on PC
Mouse and keyboard
	Mouse	Various
	Keyboard	Various
	Game port / MIDI	15-pin D female
	Game port	15-pin D female
	MIDI	15-pin D female
General input/output
	USB	USB Type A female
	Laptop docking station	Various
	IEEE 1394 (FireWire)	FireWire, 8 Position 8 Contact (8P8C) female
	Ethernet	8 Position 8 Contact (8P8C) female
	Ethernet	Various
	Computer network	Various
	Printer	Various
	SCSI	SCSI connector
	Landline/Modem	RJ11 female
	Serial port	9-pin D male
	Parallel port	25-pin D female
	High-Definition Multimedia Interface	HDMI female and male.
Video
	Analog monitor	15-pin VGA female and male.
	Digital monitor	Various, mainly DVI female and male.
	Mini display connector	Various
	Monitor	Various
Audio
	Analog microphone audio input (mono or stereo).	3.5 mm TRS
	Analog line level audio input.	3.5 mm TRS
	Analog line level audio output.	3.5 mm TRS
	Analog audio output for headphones.	3.5 mm TRS
	Analog audio output for speakers.	3.5 mm TRS
	Analog audio output for telephone handset.	4 Position 4 Contact (4P4C) female
Power Supply / Electrical
	Alternating current	IEC 60320 connector female
	Direct current	DC connector female

== Front panel LEDs ==
These front panel LEDs are usually used on the PC System Design Guide:

- Power LED: indicates the power status, including system full on (LED on) and system sleep (LED flickering).
- HDD LED: indicates the HDD/SSD host input/output status.

== See also ==
- ATX
- Legacy-free PC
- Multimedia PC
- Sound card
- IBM PC–compatible
- PoweredUSB (proprietary high-power USB extension using other color-coded ports)
