= IMac (Intel-based) =

Line of all-in-one desktop computers by Apple

iMac (Intel-based)

- iMac (2020)
- Developer: Apple Inc.
- Type: All-in-one
- Released: January 10, 2006; 20 years ago (original model); August 4, 2020; 6 years ago (last model)
- Discontinued: April 20, 2021; 5 years ago (Retina 4K 21.5 in (550 mm)); October 30, 2021; 4 years ago (21.5 in (550 mm)); March 8, 2022; 4 years ago (27 in (690 mm))
- Operating system: macOS
- CPU: Intel Core i3, i5, i7, i9, Intel Core Duo (original model)
- Predecessor: iMac G5 eMac
- Successor: iMac (Apple silicon)
- Related: Mac Mini; Mac Pro iMac Pro

The iMac is a series of all-in-one desktop computers designed, manufactured, and sold by Apple Inc. Between 2006 and 2022, the iMac series used chipsets based on Intel architecture. While sold, it was one of three desktop computers in the Mac lineup, serving as an all-in-one alternative to the Mac Mini, and sat below the performance range Mac Pro. It was sold alongside a higher-end, Xeon-based iMac Pro from 2017 to 2021.

The earliest Intel iMacs reused the same white polycarbonate enclosure as the iMac G5. Later models shifted to aluminum and plastic, and then a unibody aluminum case. The iMacs released after October 2012 also featured a much thinner display, with the edge measuring just 5 mm. This design would persist until the line was discontinued.

As part of the Mac transition to Apple's own processors, the Intel-based iMac was succeeded by the Apple silicon iMac beginning in 2021. Apple discontinued the 21.5 in (550 mm)-inch Intel iMac the same year, with the 27 in (690 mm) model discontinued in March 2022, following the announcement of the Mac Studio and 21.5 in (550 mm) Apple Studio Display.

== Overview ==
The iMac is an all-in-one personal computer. The machine has an integrated Liquid-crystal display (LCD), with the computer components integrated either behind the screen or below it in a "chin". An L-shaped aluminum foot allows the screen to be tilted but does not offer height adjustment. Ports for connecting peripherals are located on the bottom edge of the computer; an optical drive is located along the right edge of certain models. If wireless peripherals are used, the iMac's only cable is the power cord routed through the back.

On June 22, 2020, Apple's Worldwide Developer Conference keynote included the announcement that future Macintosh computers would transition yet again to Apple's own ARM-based system-on-chips; in April 2021, Apple unveiled a redesigned iMac based on its M1 system-on-chip.

== Models ==
=== White (2006) ===
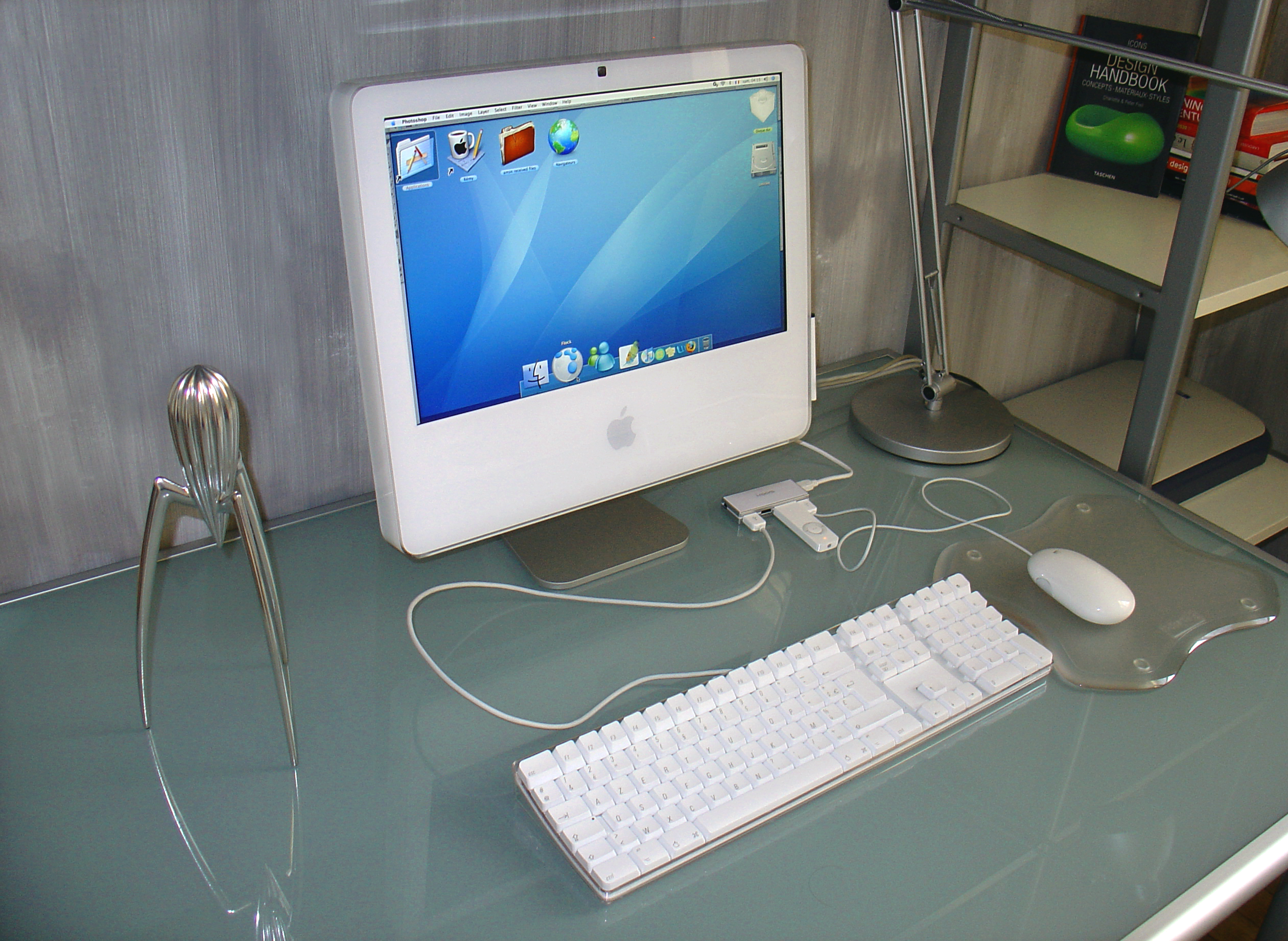
A 17-inch iMac

At the Macworld Conference and Expo on January 10, 2006, Steve Jobs announced that the new iMac would be the first Macintosh to use Intel processors. The introduction of the new iMac alongside the MacBook Pro was the start of the Mac transition to Intel processors, six months earlier than the timetable Apple established. It retained the look and features of the preceding iMac G5, with a white plastic enclosure less than 1.5 inches (38 mm) at its thinnest edge. It also shipped at the same price points. The first Intel iMac featured an Intel Core Duo processor and PCI Express graphics processing units (GPUs). Like the iSight revision of the iMac G5, the machine was not designed to be user-serviced, and almost all components are difficult to access; the exception are the random-access memory slots, which are found on the bottom of the machine. One update from the iMac G5 was the addition of a Mini-DVI port that allowed for extending the computer contents to a second monitor versus mirroring the image.

In early February 2006, Apple confirmed reports of video display problems on the new Intel-based iMacs. When playing video on Apple's Front Row media browser, some 20-inch iMacs (those built-to-order with upgraded video cards) showed random horizontal lines, ghosting, video tearing and other problems. The problem was fixed with a software update.

An education-only model of the iMac shipped in July 2006 that replaced the eMac in Apple's lineup. This model came with a lower starting price, but had a smaller hard drive, integrated graphics processor, and a combo optical drive rather than the SuperDrives on other iMacs. The entire iMac lineup was refreshed with a Core 2 Duo chip and a lower price in September 2006. Apple added a new 24-inch model with an IPS panel display and a resolution of 1920 × 1200 (WUXGA), making it the first iMac to be able to display 1080p content in its full resolution, and a VESA Flat Display Mounting Interface.

These early iMacs were generally praised, with Walt Mossberg writing that the Intel-based iMac remained the best desktop personal computer available. Performance depended on the software; PCMag and others found that software unoptimized for Intel processors ran slowly, especially games that were already poorly optimized for the Mac. Macworld recommended potential buyers hold off until there was more software for Intel machines. Other criticisms included the low amount of starting memory, lack of user-serviceability, and the chin, which Anand Lal Shimpi called "bottom-heavy".

==== Specifications ====
Model	Early 2006		Mid 2006	Late 2006			
Release date	January 10, 2006		July 5, 2006	September 6, 2006			
Display	17-inch 1440 × 900	20-inch 1680 × 1050	17-inch 1440 × 900			20-inch, 1680 × 1050	24-inch 1920 × 1200 IPS
Processor	1.83 GHz Intel Core Duo	2.0 GHz Intel Core Duo	1.83 GHz Intel Core Duo	1.83 GHz Intel Core 2 Duo	2 GHz Intel Core 2 Duo	2.16 GHz Intel Core 2 Duo	
Cache	2 MB L2 cache					4 MB L2 cache	
System bus	667 MHz front-side bus						
Memory	512 MB single SO-DIMM, one slot free Expandable to 2 GB				512 MB (2× 256 MB) or 1 GB (2× 512 MB); Expandable to 3 GB		
Video card	ATI Radeon X1600 with 128 MB GDDR3 SDRAM; Upgradeable to 256 MB (20-inch model)		Intel GMA 950 with 64 MB shared memory		ATI Radeon X1600 with 128 MB GDDR3 SDRAM		Nvidia GeForce 7300 GT with 128 MB GDDR3 SDRAM
Hard drive	160 GB; Optional: 250 GB	250 GB; Optional: 500 GB	80 GB; Optional: 160 GB	160 GB	160 GB; Optional: 250, 500 GB	250 GB; Optional: 500 GB	
Hard drive	Serial ATA 7200 rpm						
Optical drive	Slot-loading 8× SuperDrive with 2.4× DL recording (DVD+R DL, DVD±RW, CD-RW)		24× combo drive (DVD-ROM, CD-RW)		SuperDrive		
Network	Internal AirPort Extreme 802.11a/b/g Gigabit Ethernet; Apple Remote infrared receiver Bluetooth 2.0 + EDR (except late 2006 1.83 GHz)				Internal Airport Extreme 802.11a/b/g (draft-n disabled by default); Gigabit Ethernet; Apple Remote infrared receiver Bluetooth 2.0 + EDR		
Peripherals	3× USB 2.0; 2× FireWire 400; Headphone/digital audio output Audio line-in			3× USB 2.0; 2× FireWire 400; Headphone/digital audio output Audio line-in/digital audio input			3× USB 2.0; 1× FireWire 400; 1× FireWire 800; Headphone/digital audio output Audio line-in/digital audio input
Weight	15.5 lbs (7 kg)	22 lbs (10 kg)	15.5 lbs (7 kg)			22 lbs (10 kg)	24.7 lbs (11.2 kg)
Original operating system	Mac OS X 10.4 "Tiger"						

=== Aluminum (2007–2009) ===
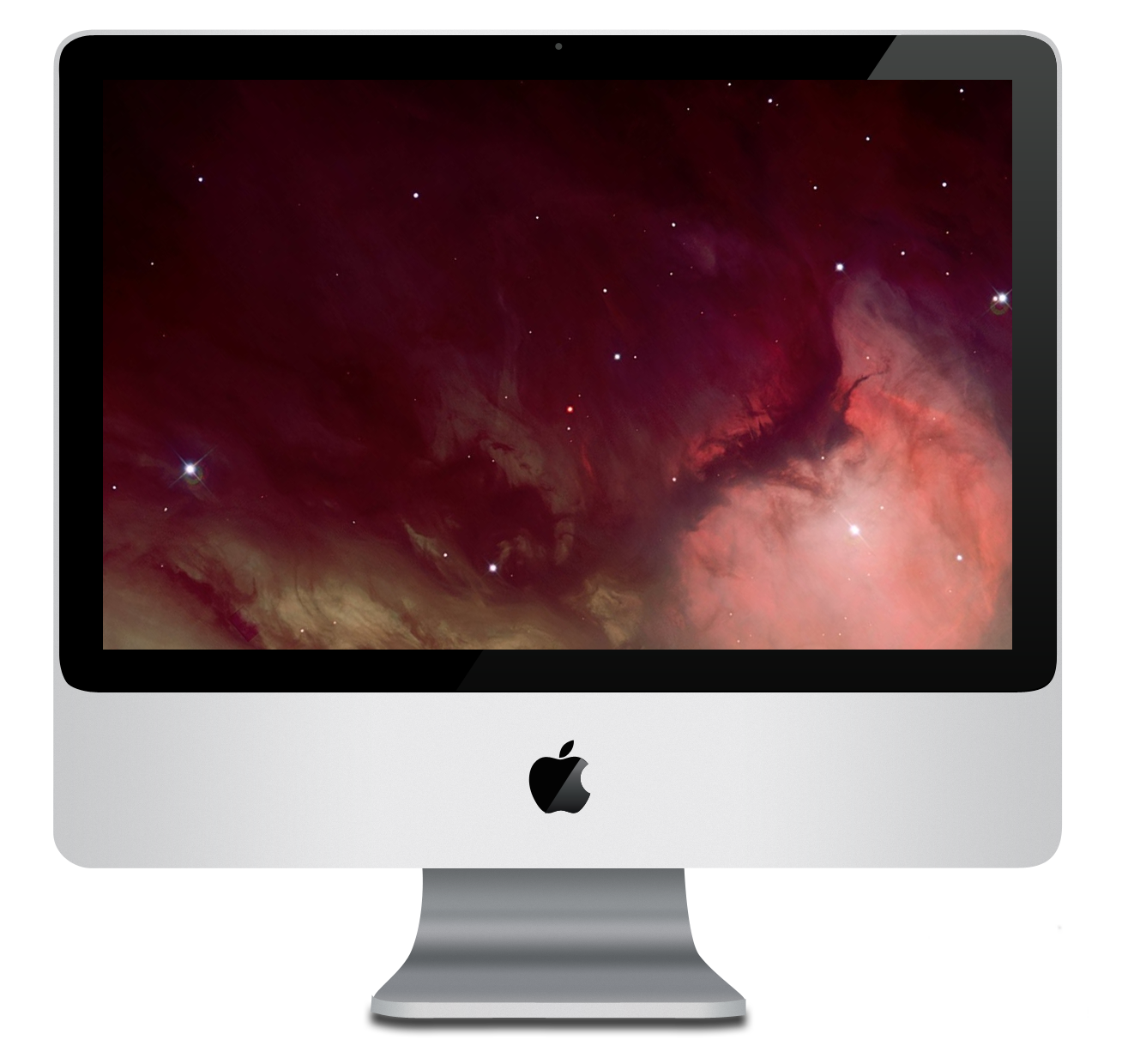
24-inch Aluminum iMac

In August 2007, Apple introduced a complete redesign of the iMac, featuring an aluminum, glass and plastic enclosure. It has a black, plastic backplate that is not user-removable. The 17-inch model was completely removed from the lineup, and it was available only in 20-inch and 24-inch models. The 24-inch model's display has better contrast and color conformity over a wide range of viewing angles. There is only one visible screw on the entire computer, located at the base of the iMac for accessing the memory slots. A plastic model from the previous generation remained as an option for education buyers.

In March 2009, Apple released a minor refresh of the iMac line. Changes included a fourth USB port, replacement of two FireWire 400 ports with one FireWire 800 port, replacement of mini-DVI with Mini DisplayPort, and a slightly redesigned base which is vertically thinner. Otherwise, the exterior design is almost identical to the 2007 and 2008 models. The models were one 20-inch configuration and three 24-inch configurations (instead of two at each screen size as before).

Apple doubled the default RAM and hard-disk size on all models, moving the RAM to the DDR3 specification. This revision also introduced a new, smaller, and more compact Apple Keyboard that excluded the numeric keypad and forward delete key in favor of the fn + Delete keyboard shortcut by default. Users could, however, replace this version with a more traditional, full-size model with a numeric keypad by requesting Apple to build their machine to order through its online store.

==== Specifications ====
Model	Mid 2007			Early 2008				Early 2009		Mid 2009 (education only)		
Released	August 7, 2007			April 28, 2008				March 3, 2009		April 7, 2009	March 4, 2010	May 3, 2011
Discontinued	April 28, 2008			March 3, 2009				October 20, 2009		March 4, 2010	May 3, 2011	March 7, 2012
Model identifier	iMac7,1			iMac8,1				iMac9,1				
Display	20-inch 1680 × 1050		24-inch 1920 × 1200 IPS	20-inch 1680 × 1050		24-inch 1920 × 1200 IPS		20-inch 1680 × 1050	24-inch 1920 × 1200 IPS	20-inch 1680 × 1050		
Processor	2.0 GHz Intel Core 2 Duo; 4 MB L2 cache	2.4 GHz Intel Core 2 Duo	2.4 GHz Intel Core 2 Duo	2.4 GHz Intel Core 2 Duo; 6 MB L2 cache	2.66 GHz Intel Core 2 Duo	2.8 GHz Intel Core 2 Duo; 6 MB L2 cache	3.06 GHz Intel Core 2 Duo	2.66 GHz Intel Core 2 Duo; 6 MB L2 cache	2.66 GHz or 2.93 GHz Intel Core 2 Duo; 6 MB L2 cache	2.0 GHz Intel Core 2 Duo; 3 MB L2 cache	2.26 GHz Intel Core 2 Duo; 3 MB L2 cache	
Processor	2.0 GHz Intel Core 2 Duo; 4 MB L2 cache	2.4 GHz Intel Core 2 Duo	Optional: 2.8 GHz Intel Core 2 Extreme; 4 MB L2 cache	2.4 GHz Intel Core 2 Duo; 6 MB L2 cache	2.66 GHz Intel Core 2 Duo	2.8 GHz Intel Core 2 Duo; 6 MB L2 cache	3.06 GHz Intel Core 2 Duo	Optional: 2.93 GHzIntel Core 2 Duo	Optional: 3.06 GHz Intel Core 2 Duo	2.0 GHz Intel Core 2 Duo; 3 MB L2 cache	Optional: 2.66 GHz Intel Core 2 Duo	
Front-side bus	800 MHz			1066 MHz								
Memory	1 GB (2× 512 MB) or 2 GB (2× 1 GB); Optional: 6 GB (4 GB, officially)			1 GB (2× 512 MB); Optional: 6 GB (4 GB, officially)	2 GB (2× 1 GB); Optional: 6 GB (4 GB, officially)			2 GB (2× 1 GB) or 4 GB (2× 2 GB); Optional: 8 GB		1 GB (1× 1 GB); Optional:2, 4 GB, expandable to 8 GB		2 GB (2× 1 GB); Optional:4 GB, expandable to 8 GB
Memory	SO-DIMM DDR2 SDRAM-667 MHz			SO-DIMM DDR2 SDRAM-800 MHz				SO-DIMM DDR3 SDRAM-1066 MHz				
Video card	ATI Radeon HD 2400 XT with 128 MB GDDR3 SDRAM		ATI Radeon HD 2600 PRO with 256 MB GDDR3 SDRAM	ATI Radeon HD 2400 XT with 128 MB GDDR3 SDRAM	ATI Radeon HD 2600 PRO with 256 MB GDDR3 SDRAM		Nvidia GeForce 8800 GS with 512 MB GDDR3 SDRAM	Nvidia GeForce 9400M with 256 MB shared memory	Nvidia GeForce 9400M with 256 MB shared memory or Nvidia GeForce GT 120 with 256 MB GDDR3 SDRAM	Nvidia GeForce 9400M with 256 MB shared memory		
Video card	Optional: 2600 PRO with 256 MB		—N/a			Optional:NVIDIA GeForce 8800 GS with 512 MB GDDR3 SDRAM	—N/a		Optional:Nvidia GeForce GT 130 or ATI Radeon HD 4850, both with 512 MB of GDDR3 SDRAM	—N/a		
Storage / Hard drive	250 GB; Optional: 320, 500, 750 GB, 1 TB		320 GB; Optional: 500, 750 GB, or 1 TB	250 GB; Optional: 320, 500, 750 GB, 1 TB	320 GB; Optional: 500, 750 GB, 1 TB		500 GB; Optional: 750 GB, 1 TB	320 GB; Optional: 640 GB or 1 TB	640 GB; Optional: 1 TB	160 GB; Optional: 320 GB		
Storage / Hard drive	Serial ATA 7200 rpm											
Optical drive	8× double-layer SuperDrive (DVD±R DL, DVD±RW, CD-RW)											
Connectivity	Internal AirPort Extreme 802.11a/b/g/n (draft-n enabled); Gigabit Ethernet; Apple Remote infrared receiver Bluetooth 2.0 + EDR			Internal AirPort Extreme (802.11n) 802.11a/b/g/n (draft-n enabled); Gigabit Ethernet; Apple Remote infrared receiver Bluetooth 2.1 + EDR						Internal AirPort Extreme (802.11n) 802.11a/b/g/n (draft-n enabled); Gigabit Ethernet		
Video out	Mini-DVI							Mini DisplayPort				
Peripherals	3× USB 2.0; 1× FireWire 400; 1× FireWire 800; Headphone/digital audio output Audio line-in/digital audio input							4× USB 2.0; 1× FireWire 800; Headphone/digital audio output Audio line-in/digital audio input				
Weight	20 lb (9.1 kg)		25.4 lb (11.5 kg)	20 lb (9.1 kg)		25.4 lb (11.5 kg)		20 lb (9.1 kg)	25.4 lb (11.5 kg)	20 lb (9.1 kg)		
Minimum operating system	Mac OS X 10.4 Tiger			Mac OS X 10.5 Leopard								
Maximum operating system	OS X 10.11 El Capitan if 2 GB RAM installed, otherwise Mac OS X 10.6 Snow Leopard							OS X 10.11 El Capitan		OS X 10.11 El Capitan if 2 GB RAM installed, otherwise Mac OS X 10.6 Snow Leopard		OS X 10.11 El Capitan
Maximum operating system	Unofficially, macOS 15 Sequoia can be installed with OpenCore Legacy Patcher (OCLP); CPU upgrade required.			Unofficially, macOS 15 Sequoia can be installed with OpenCore Legacy Patcher (OCLP).								

=== Unibody (2009–2011) ===
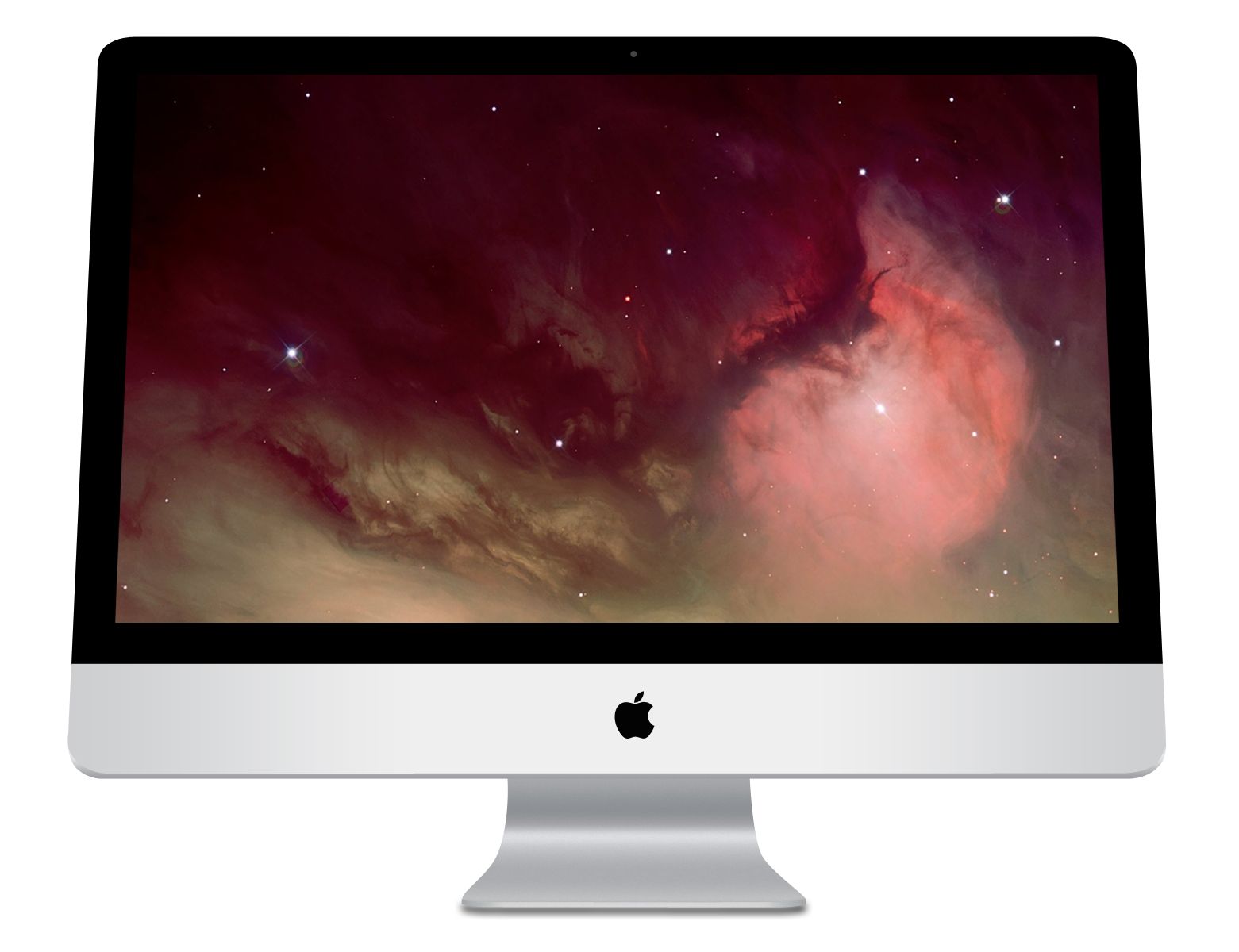
27-inch Unibody iMac

In October 2009, a 16:9 aspect ratio screen was introduced in 21.5" and 27" models, replacing the 20" and 24" 16:10 aspect ratio screens of the previous aluminum models (a 24" iMac was brought back in 2021, albeit with a different aspect ratio). The back is made of aluminum instead of plastic, and is a continuation of the aluminum body from the front and sides. Video card options entirely switched to AMD, except for the standard onboard Nvidia card in the base smaller model. The iMac's processor selection saw a significant increase.

The Intel i-series chips are introduced to Mac for the first time on the higher-spec 27-inch models.

Default RAM has also been increased across the iMac range. With the advent of the larger screens, Apple doubled the number of memory slots from two to four. Consequently, the maximum memory capacity was also doubled (to 16 GB), and for Intel Core i-series (27-inch), quadrupled, to 32 GB.

The 27-inch models of the line became the first to offer Target Display Mode, allowing the iMac to be used as an external display for another Mac computer when connected via Mini DisplayPort, a feature that was extended to the 21.5-inch models onwards with the introduction of Thunderbolt.

The Mid 2010 iMac 27" has AMD Radeon HD5650 and HD5750 graphic cards. Both cards cannot support the low-level Metal API, preventing this model from upgrading to Mojave and Catalina. AMD had developed a firmware upgrade that would allow both graphic cards to support Metal and Mid 2010 iMac to be upgraded to latest macOS, but Apple had refused to certify them.

The Late 2011 Unibody iMac is also the last model to include an internal SuperDrive.

==== Specifications ====
According to Apple, all of these models are obsolete. (Note: Apple products that have been discontinued for 7 years and no longer receive hardware support or spare parts)

Model	Late 2009				Mid 2010				Mid 2011				Late 2011 (education only)
Component / processor model	Wolfdale-3M Intel Core			Lynnfield Intel Core	Clarkdale Intel Core			Lynnfield Intel Core	Sandy Bridge Intel Core				
Release date	October 20, 2009				July 27, 2010				May 3, 2011				August 8, 2011
Discontinued Date	July 27, 2010				May 3, 2011				October 23, 2012				March 5, 2013
Marketing model no.	MB950	MC413	MB952	MB953	MC508	MC509	MC510	MC511	MC309	MC812	MC813	MC814	MC978
Model number	A1311		A1312		A1311		A1312		A1311		A1312		A1311
Model identifier	iMac10,1			iMac11,1	iMac11,2		iMac11,3		iMac12,1		iMac12,2		iMac12,1
MSRP (USD)	$1199	$1399	$1699	$1899	$1199	$1499	$1699	$1999	$1199	$1499	$1699	$1999	$999
Enclosure	Aluminum and glass												
Display	21.5-inch 1920 × 1080		27-inch 2560 × 1440		21.5-inch 1920 × 1080		27-inch, 2560 × 1440		21.5-inch 1920 × 1080		27-inch 2560 × 1440		21.5-inch, 1920 × 1080
Display	Glossy glass-covered widescreen 16:9, LED backlighting and IPS technology												
Processor	3.06 GHz (E7600 Wolfdale-3M) Intel Core 2 Duo; 3 MB L2 cache			2.66 GHz 4-core (Turbo Boost up to 3.2 GHz) (750 Lynnfield) Intel Core i5 8 MB L3 cache	3.06 GHz 2-core (540 Clarkdale) Intel Core i3 4 MB L3 cache	3.2 GHz 2-Core (550 Clarkdale) Intel Core i3 4 MB L3 cache		2.8 GHz 4-core (Turbo Boost up to 3.33 GHz (760 Lynnfield) Intel Core i5 8 MB L3 cache	2.5 GHz 4-core (Turbo Boost up to 3.3 GHz) (2400S Sandy Bridge) Intel Core i5 6 MB L3 cache	2.7 GHz 4-core (Turbo Boost up to 3.7 GHz) (2500S Sandy Bridge); Intel Core i5 6 MB L3 cache		3.1 GHz 4-core (Turbo Boost up to 3.4 GHz (2400 Sandy Bridge) Intel Core i5 6 MB L3 cache	3.1 GHz 2-core (2100 Sandy Bridge) Intel Core i3 3 MB L3 cache
Processor	Optional: 3.33 GHz (E8600 Wolfdale) Intel Core 2 Duo 6 MB L2 cache			Optional:2.8 GHz 4-core (Turbo Boost up to 3.46 GHz) (860) Intel Core i7	Optional:3.2 GHz 2-Core (550) Intel Core i3 or 3.6 GHz (680 Clarkdale) Intel Core i5		Optional:3.6 GHz 2-core (Turbo Boost up to 3.86 GHz) (680 Clarkdale) Intel Core i5	Optional: 2.93 GHz 4-core (Turbo Boost up to 3.6 GHz) (870) Intel Core i7	—N/a	Optional: 2.8 GHz 4-core (Turbo Boost up to 3.8 GHz) (2600S) Intel Core i7	—N/a	Optional: 3.4 GHz 4-core (Turbo Boost up to 3.8 GHz) (2600) Intel Core i7	—N/a
System bus	Front-side bus			Intel Direct Media Interface									
System bus	1066 MHz; Optional: 1333 MHz with 3.33 GHz Core 2 Duo option			2.5 GT/s									
Memory	4 GB (two 2 GB, two slots empty); Optional: 16 GB			4 GB (two 2 GB, two slots empty); Expandable to 32 GB (16 GB supported by Apple) except 2-core i3 and i5 models which only support 16 GB									2 GB (one 2 GB); Optional: 8 GB
Memory	1066 MHz; PC3-8500 DDR3; SO-DIMM SDRAM			1066 MHz; PC3-8500 DDR3; SO-DIMM SDRAM (Upgradable to 1333 MHz PC3-10600 DDR3; SO-DIMM SDRAM)	1333 MHz; PC3-10600 DDR3; SO-DIMM SDRAM								
Video card	Nvidia GeForce 9400M with 256 MB shared memory	ATI Radeon HD 4670 with 256 MB GDDR3 SDRAM		ATI Radeon HD 4850 with 512 MB GDDR3 SDRAM	ATI Radeon HD 4670 with 256 MB GDDR3 SDRAM	ATI Radeon HD 5670 with 512 MB GDDR3 SDRAM		ATI Radeon HD 5750 with 1 GB GDDR5 SDRAM	AMD Radeon HD 6750M with 512 MB GDDR5 SDRAM	AMD Radeon HD 6770M with 512 MB GDDR5 SDRAM		AMD Radeon HD 6970M with 1 GB GDDR5 SDRAM	AMD Radeon HD 6750M with 256 MB GDDR5 SDRAM
Video card	Nvidia GeForce 9400M with 256 MB shared memory	ATI Radeon HD 4670 with 256 MB GDDR3 SDRAM		ATI Radeon HD 4850 with 512 MB GDDR3 SDRAM	ATI Radeon HD 4670 with 256 MB GDDR3 SDRAM	ATI Radeon HD 5670 with 512 MB GDDR3 SDRAM		ATI Radeon HD 5750 with 1 GB GDDR5 SDRAM	AMD Radeon HD 6750M with 512 MB GDDR5 SDRAM	AMD Radeon HD 6770M with 512 MB GDDR5 SDRAM		Optional: with 2 GB GDDR5 SDRAM	AMD Radeon HD 6750M with 256 MB GDDR5 SDRAM
Storage / Hard drive	500 GB; Optional: 1 or 2 TB		1 TB; Optional: 2 TB		500 GB; Optional: 1, 2 TB	1 TB; Optional: 2 TB	1 TB; Optional: 2 TB and/or 256 GB SSD		500 GB	1 TB; Optional: 2 TB and/or 256 GB SSD			250 GB
Storage / Hard drive	Serial ATA 7200 rpm												
Optical drive	8× double-layer SuperDrive (DVD±R DL/DVD±RW/CD-RW)												
Connectivity	Internal AirPort Extreme 802.11a/b/g/n Gigabit Ethernet; Built-in infrared (IR) receiver for Apple Remote; Bluetooth 2.1 + EDR												Internal AirPort Extreme 802.11a/b/g/n Gigabit Ethernet; Built-in infrared (IR) receiver for Apple Remote
Camera	iSight camera (640 × 480, 0.3 MP)								FaceTime HD camera 720p (1280 × 720, 0.9 MP)				
Video out	Single Mini DisplayPort; Mini DisplayPort to VGA, DVI, HDMI, and DisplayPort adapters available								Single Thunderbolt 1 (21.5-inch) Dual Thunderbolt 1 (27-inch)				Single Mini DisplayPort
Peripherals	4× USB 2.0; 1× FireWire 800; SD card slot Headphone/digital audio output Audio line-in/digital audio input				4× USB 2.0; 1× FireWire 800; SDXC card slot Headphone/digital audio output Audio line-in/digital audio input				4× USB 2.0; 1× FireWire 800; SDXC card slot Headphone/digital audio output Audio line-in/digital audio input 1x Thunderbolt port (21.5 in (550 mm)); 2x Thunderbolt ports (27 in (690 mm))				4× USB 2.0; 1× FireWire 800; SDXC card slot Headphone/digital audio output Audio line-in/digital audio input
	20.5 lb (9.3 kg)		30.5 lb (13.8 kg)		20.5 lb (9.3 kg)		30.5 lb (13.8 kg)		20.5 lb (9.3 kg)		30.5 lb (13.8 kg)		20.5 lb (9.3 kg)
Minimum operating system	Mac OS X 10.6 Snow Leopard												
Latest release operating system	macOS 10.13 High Sierra												
Latest release operating system	Unofficially, macOS 15 Sequoia can be installed with OpenCore Legacy Patcher (OCLP).												

=== Slim Unibody (2012–2017) ===
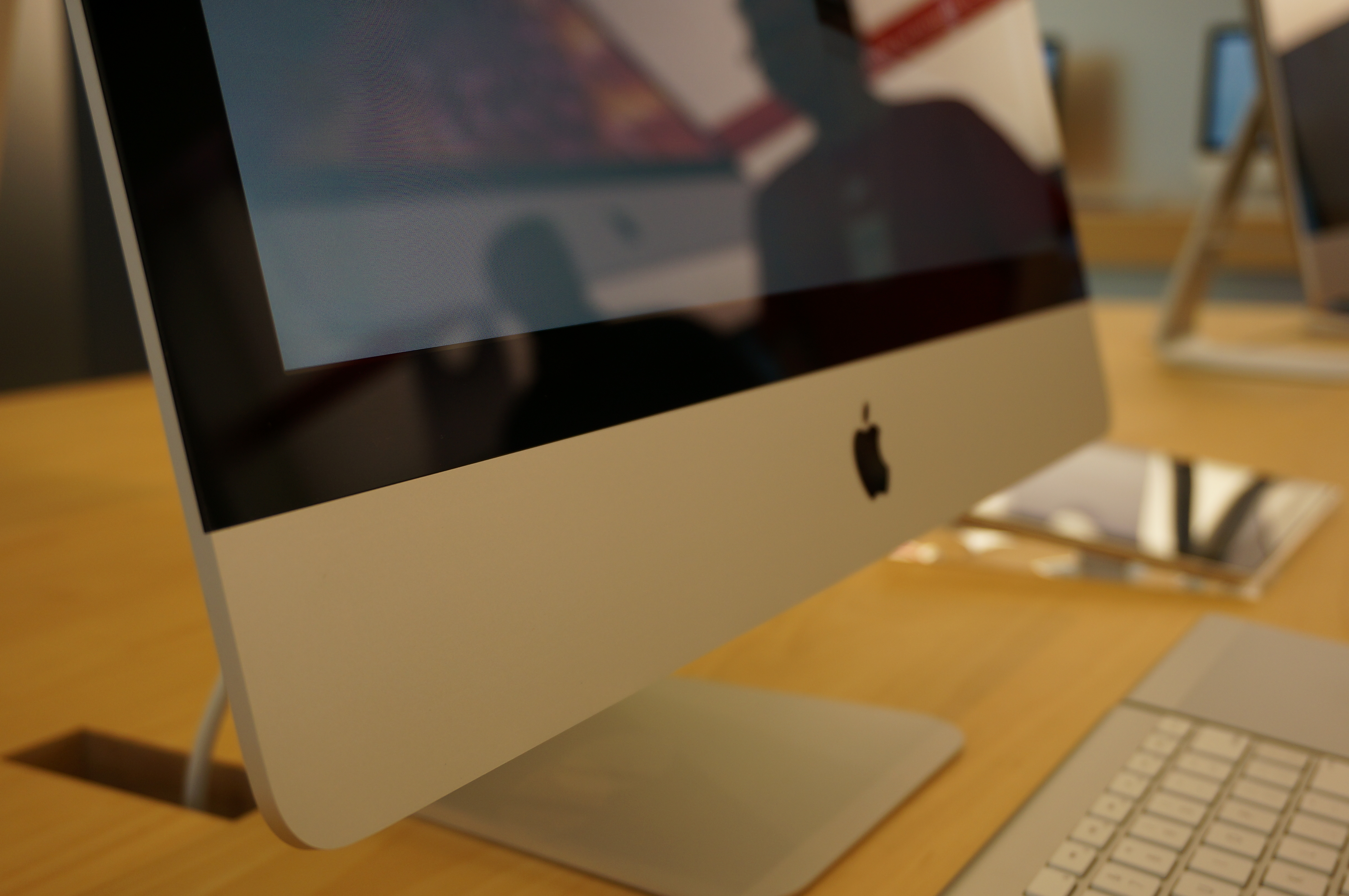
27-inch Slim Unibody iMac

In October 2012, a new iMac model was introduced that featured a smaller body depth than the previous models, measuring 5 mm at its thinnest point, and without an internal SuperDrive. This was partly achieved by using a process called Full Lamination. The display and glass are laminated together, eliminating a 2 mm gap between them. The 21.5-in and 27-inch screens remained at their previous resolutions, 1920 × 1080 and 2560 × 1440 respectively.

As with the 2009 model, memory has been upgraded; the standard specification is now 8 GB, with the 21.5-in model supporting up to 16 GB and the 27-inch model supporting up to 32 GB. It was reported that the 21.5 in iMac would have non-replaceable soldered memory similar to the MacBook Air and Retina display MacBook Pro though tear-downs show that it uses removable memory but accessing the modules requires ungluing the screen and removing the motherboard. The 27-inch version features an access port to upgrade memory without disassembling the display. Apple also upgraded the computers' processors, using Intel's Ivy Bridge microarchitecture-based Core i5 and Core i7 microprocessors.

Video cards are now Nvidia as standard. USB 3.0 ports were included for the first time. The 2012 iMac also features the option of a Fusion Drive which combines an SSD and a conventional HDD to create more efficient and faster storage. Apple also removed the built-in optical drive starting with the 2012 model.

On March 5, 2013, Apple quietly announced an education-only version of the iMac, with less powerful specs for a cheaper price. It included a 3.3 GHz dual-core Intel Core i3 processor, 4 GB memory, a 500 GB hard drive and Intel HD Graphics 4000, retailing for US$1,099, $200 cheaper than the base-level consumer iMac.

On September 24, 2013, the 2012 iMac model was updated with 4th-generation Intel Haswell processors and Nvidia 7xx series GPU, promising up to 1.4× improvements in performance. It also has 802.11ac Wi-Fi, which is capable of reaching speeds up to 1300 Mbit/s and PCIe-based flash storage, offering up to 1.5× the performance of previous Ivy Bridge unibody iMacs. This applies to both the Fusion Drive and pure-SSD options. These became the last iMacs to offer Target Display Mode, as the Retina line introduced the following year are incompatible with the feature due to resolution differences.

At WWDC on June 5, 2017, a refreshed model was added with Kaby Lake processors and Bluetooth 4.2 support. Apple retailed the 21.5-inch model until October 29, 2021. It was sold in a single stock configuration priced at $1,099 with a 2.3 GHz dual-core 7th-generation Intel Core i5 processor. The machine was heavily criticized (more so towards the end of its production) for its lagging specifications, outdated design, and comparatively high price. The machine, however, was said to be popular among education shoppers. It was the last Mac to have a Fusion Drive (albeit as an option), and after having them for 36 years, the last Mac to have a traditional hard drive. It was also the last Apple product not to have a Retina display.

==== Specifications ====
Obsolete	Vintage	Discontinued

Model name		Late 2012				Early 2013 (education only)	Late 2013				Mid 2014	Late 2015		2017
Component / processor model		Ivy Bridge Intel Core					Haswell Intel Core					Broadwell Intel Core		Kaby Lake Intel Core
Timetable	Released	November 30, 2012		January 2013		March 5, 2013	September 24, 2013				June 18, 2014	October 13, 2015		June 5, 2017
Timetable	Discontinued	September 24, 2013				June 18, 2014	October 13, 2015					June 5, 2017		October 29, 2021
Model numbers	Model	A1418		A1419		A1418			A1419		A1418			
Model numbers	Model identifier	iMac13,1		iMac13,2		iMac13,1	iMac14,1	iMac14,3	iMac14,2		iMac14,4	iMac16,1		iMac18,1
Model numbers	Apple Order number	MD093	MD094	MD095	MD096	MD699	ME086	ME087	ME088	ME089	MF883, MG022	MK142	MK442	MMQA2, MHK03 (2020 SSD revision)
MSRP		$1299	$1499	$1799	$1999	$1099	$1299	$1499	$1799	$1999	$1099	$1099	$1299	$1099
Enclosure		Aluminum and glass												
Display		21.5-inch 1920 × 1080		27-inch 2560 × 1440		21.5-inch 1920 × 1080			27-inch 2560 × 1440		21.5-inch 1920 × 1080			
Display		Glossy glass-covered widescreen 16:9, LED backlighting and IPS technology												
Performance	Processor	2.7 GHz 4-core (Turbo Boost up to 3.2 GHz) (3330S Ivy Bridge) Intel Core i5	2.9 GHz 4-core (Turbo Boost up to 3.6 GHz) (3470S Ivy Bridge) Intel Core i5 Optional: 3.1 GHz 4-core (Turbo Boost up to 3.9 GHz) (3770S Ivy Bridge) Intel Core i7 8 MB L3 cache)	2.9 GHz 4-core (Turbo Boost up to 3.6 GHz) (3470S Ivy Bridge) Intel Core i5	3.2 GHz 4-core (Turbo Boost up to 3.6 GHz) (3470 Ivy Bridge) Intel Core i5 Optional: 3.4 GHz 4-core (Turbo Boost up to 3.9 GHz) (3770 Ivy Bridge) Intel Core i7 8 MB L3 cache)	3.3 GHz 2-core (3225 Ivy Bridge) Intel Core i3	2.7 GHz 4-core (Turbo Boost up to 3.2 GHz) (4570R Haswell) Intel Core i5	2.9 GHz 4-core (Turbo Boost up to 3.6 GHz (4570S Haswell) Intel Core i5 Optional: 3.1 GHz 4-core (Turbo Boost up to 3.9 GHz) (4770S Haswell) Intel Core i7 8 MB L3 cache)	3.2 GHz 4-core (Turbo Boost up to 3.6 GHz (4570 Haswell) Intel Core i5	3.4 GHz 4-core (Turbo Boost up to 3.8 GHz (4670 Haswell) Intel Core i5 Optional: 3.5 GHz 4-core (Turbo Boost up to 3.9 GHz) (4771 Haswell) Intel Core i7 8 MB L3 cache)	1.4 GHz 2-core (Turbo Boost up to 2.7 GHz (4260U Haswell) Intel Core i5	1.6 GHz 2-core (Turbo Boost up to 2.7 GHz (5250U Broadwell) Intel Core i5	2.8 GHz 4-core (Turbo Boost up to 3.3 GHz) (5575R Broadwell) Intel Core i5	2.3 GHz 2-core (Turbo Boost up to 3.6 GHz) (7360U Kaby Lake) Intel Core i5
Performance	Processor	6 MB L3 cache				3 MB L3 cache	4 MB L3 cache	6 MB L3 cache			3 MB shared L3 cache		4 MB shared L3 cache	4 MB shared L3 cache and 64 MB L4 cache
Performance	System bus	Intel Direct Media Interface 5 GT/s												
Performance	Memory	8 GB (2× 4 GB, non-user-accessible AASP Installable Slot); Optional: 16 GB		8 GB (2× 4 GB, 2× empty slot); Optional: 16 and 32 GB		4 GB (two 2 GB, non-user-accessible AASP Installable Slot); Expandable to 16 GB with third-party modules.	8 GB (two 4 GB, non-user-accessible AASP Installable Slot); Optional: 16 GB		8 GB (2× 4 GB, 2× empty slot); Optional: 16 or 32 GB		8 GB (soldered on-board)	8 GB (soldered on-board); Optional: 16 GB		8 GB (two 4 GB, non-user-accessible AASP Installable Slot); Optional: 16 GB, expandable to 32 GB with third-party modules.
Performance	Memory	1600 MHz PC3-12800 DDR3 SO-DIMM SDRAM									1600 MHz PC3-12800 LPDDR3 SDRAM (soldered on-board)	1867 MHz PC3-14900 LPDDR3 SDRAM (soldered on-board)		2133 MHz DDR4
Performance	Video card	Nvidia GeForce GT 640M with 512 MB GDDR5 SDRAM	Nvidia GeForce GT 650M with 512 MB GDDR5 SDRAM	Nvidia GeForce GTX 660M with 512 MB GDDR5 SDRAM	Nvidia GeForce GTX 675MX with 1 GB GDDR5 SDRAM; Optional: Nvidia GeForce GTX 680MX with 2 GB GDDR5 SDRAM	Intel HD Graphics 4000	Intel Iris Pro Graphics 5200	Nvidia GeForce GT 750M with 1 GB GDDR5 SDRAM	Nvidia GeForce GT 755M with 1 GB GDDR5 SDRAM	Nvidia GeForce GTX 775M with 2 GB GDDR5 SDRAM; Optional: Nvidia GeForce GTX 780M with 4 GB GDDR5 SDRAM	Intel HD Graphics 5000	Intel HD Graphics 6000	Intel Iris Pro Graphics 6200	Intel Iris Plus Graphics 640
Storage / Hard drive		1 TB; Optional:1 TB Fusion, 128, 256, 512 GB SSD; Fusion Drive initially only for high-end model, later added low-end model support		1 TB; Optional: 3 TB HDD, 1, 3 TB Fusion, 256, 512, 768 GB SSD		500 GB	1 TB; Optional: 1 TB Fusion, 256 or 512 GB SSD		1 TB; Optional: 3 TB HDD, 1 or 3 TB Fusion, 256, 512 GB, or 1 TB SSD		500 GB; Optional:1 TB HDD, 1 TB Fusion, or 256 GB SSD	1 TB; Optional: 1 TB Fusion or 256 GB SSD	1 TB; Optional: 1 or 2 TB Fusion, or 256 GB SSD	256 GB SSD; Optional:1 TB Fusion (1 TB HDD discontinued since Q3 2020)
Storage / Hard drive		Serial ATA 5400 rpm and Mini-SATA III (6 Gbit/s) for SSD		Serial ATA 7200 rpm and Mini-SATA III (6 Gbit/s) for SSD		Serial ATA 5400 rpm	Serial ATA 5400 rpm and PCIe 2.0 ×2 5.0 GT/s (8 Gbit/s) for SSD		Serial ATA 7200 rpm and PCIe 2.0 ×2 5.0 GT/s (8 Gbit/s) for SSD		Serial ATA 5400 rpm and PCI-e for SSD			
Connectivity		Internal AirPort Extreme 802.11a/b/g/n Gigabit Ethernet; Bluetooth 4.0					Internal AirPort Extreme 802.11a/b/g/n/ac Gigabit Ethernet; Bluetooth 4.0							Internal AirPort Extreme 802.11a/b/g/n/ac Gigabit Ethernet; Bluetooth 4.2
Camera		FaceTime HD camera 720p (1280 × 720, 0.9 MP)												
Video out		Dual Thunderbolt 1; up to two 2560 x 1440 displays										Dual Thunderbolt 2; up to two 3840 x 2160 (4K) displays	Dual Thunderbolt 2; up to two 4096 x 2304 (4K UHD) displays	Dual Thunderbolt 3; up to two 4096 x 2304 (4K UHD) displays or one 5120 x 2880 (5K) dual-cable display
Peripherals		4× USB 3.0; SDXC card slot Headphone/digital audio output Kensington Lock Slot												
Peripherals		2× Thunderbolt ports Mini DisplayPort output, VGA, DVI, HDMI and DisplayPort adapters (for input) available										2x Thunderbolt 2 Mini DisplayPort output, VGA, DVI, HDMI, and DisplayPort adapters (for input) available		2x Thunderbolt 3 DisplayPort output, VGA, DVI, HDMI, and Thunderbolt 2 adapters available
Weight		12.5 lbs (5.68 kg)		21 lbs (9.54 kg)		12.5 lbs (5.68 kg)			21 lbs (9.54 kg)		12.5 lbs (5.68 kg)			
Operating system	Minimum	OS X 10.8 Mountain Lion									OS X 10.9 Mavericks	OS X 10.11 El Capitan		macOS 10.12 Sierra
Operating system	Latest release	macOS 10.15 Catalina									macOS 11 Big Sur	macOS 12 Monterey		macOS 13 Ventura
Operating system	Latest release	Unofficially, macOS 15 Sequoia can be installed with OpenCore Legacy Patcher (OCLP).												

=== Retina (2014–2020) ===
27-inch Retina iMac

A Retina Display "5K" model with a resolution of 5120 × 2880 was introduced alongside the previous year's models during a keynote on October 16, 2014. This 27-inch model was given faster Haswell processors and its two Thunderbolt ports were updated to Thunderbolt 2. Secondary storage was also upgraded to a 1TB Fusion drive as standard and video options changed over to AMD Radeon R9 M290X and M295X.

In May 2015, a separate, affordable, budget counterpart of the 5K 27-inch iMac was announced with lower specifications. That same day the Late 2013 iMac lineup was completely discontinued. Later that year, a 21.5-inch "4K" model with a resolution of 4096 × 2304 was released on October 13, 2015, with older Broadwell processors, as the 27-inch counterparts were upgraded that day directly to Skylake ones. The new rechargeable and wireless peripherals were also introduced that day.

In 2017, both 21.5 and 27-inch iMacs were refreshed with Kaby Lake processors, DDR4 memories and upgraded AMD graphics with doubled or more graphic memories, Thunderbolt 3 (USB-C) ports, and Bluetooth 4.2. They were refreshed again in 2019 with Coffee Lake processors, including an 8-core build-to-order option, faster memory, and upgraded graphics including AMD Vega graphics as top of line build-to-order options.

On August 4, 2020, Apple refreshed the 27-inch 5K iMac with Comet Lake processors, AMD RDNA architecture GPUs, the T2 security chip, a 1080p FaceTime camera, Bluetooth 5, improved speakers and microphones, and solid state drives (SSD) standard. 10 Gigabit Ethernet and nano-etched glass, similar to the Pro Display XDR, were available as upgrade options. All models include non-replaceable, soldered SSDs, while models upgraded to 4 TB and 8 TB include an expansion bay for a second SSD. It was the last Mac with an Intel processor introduced by Apple, as well as the only Intel Mac introduced after the announcement of the Mac transition to Apple silicon.

The 2019 21.5-inch models remained available but received a minor configuration change with SSDs standard, with higher-capacity Fusion Drives as a free build-to-order option, while hard disk drives were no longer available. The 2020 refresh marked the end of hard disk drives in standard configuration Macs, having been available in Macs since the Macintosh XL in 1985, as the 21.5-inch iMac was the only Mac still sold with them. In March 2021, Apple silently removed the 512 GB and 1 TB SSD configurations for the 21.5-inch iMac.

The 21.5 inch iMac with 4K Retina Display was discontinued on April 20, 2021, after the announcement of the first Apple silicon-based iMac. The 27-inch model was discontinued on March 8, 2022, after the announcement of the Mac Studio and 27-inch Apple Studio Display, and marked the end of Intel-based iMac models, and the return of the iMac to a single sized model since the introduction of 17" inch iMac G4 in 2002.

==== Specifications ====
Obsolete	Vintage	Discontinued

Model	Late 2014	Mid 2015	Late 2015				2017					2019		2019			2020		
Component / processor model	Haswell Intel Core		Broadwell Intel Core	Skylake Intel Core			Kaby Lake Intel Core					Coffee Lake Intel Core					Comet Lake Intel Core		
Release date	October 16, 2014	May 19, 2015	October 13, 2015				June 5, 2017					March 19, 2019					August 4, 2020		
Discontinued Date	October 13, 2015		June 5, 2017				March 19, 2019					April 20, 2021		August 4, 2020			March 8, 2022		
Model number	A1419		A1418	A1419			A1418		A1419			A2116		A2115			A2115		
Model identifier	iMac15,1		iMac16,2	iMac17,1			iMac18,2		iMac18,3			iMac19,2		iMac19,1			iMac20,1		iMac20,1, iMac20,2
Part number	MF886	MF885	MK452	MK462	MK472	MK482	MNDY2	MNE02	MNE92	MNEA2	MNED2	MRT32, MHK23 (SSD revision)	MRT42, MHK33 (SSD revision)	MRQY2	MRR02	MRR12	MXWT2	MXWU2	MXWV2
MSRP (USD)	$2499 (Note: On May 15, 2015, Apple reduced the price of this model to $2299.)	$1999	$1499	$1799	$1999	$2299	$1299	$1499	$1799	$1799	$2299	$1299	$1499	$1799	$1999	$2299	$1799	$1999	$2299
Display	27-inch 5120 × 2880		21.5-inch 4096 × 2304	27-inch 5120 × 2880			21.5-inch 4096 × 2304		27-inch 5120 × 2880			21.5-inch 4096 × 2304		27-inch 5120 × 2880					
Display	Glossy glass-covered widescreen 16:9, LED backlighting and IPS technology		Glossy glass-covered widescreen 16:9, LED backlighting and IPS technology with P3 color gamut				Glossy glass-covered widescreen 16:9, LED backlighting and IPS technology with P3 color gamut 500 nits brightness										Glossy glass-covered widescreen 16:9, LED backlighting, and IPS technology with P3 color gamut. 500 nits brightness, support for True Tone technology. Configurable with nano-texture glass for $500 before 2021-04-21, then $300		
Processor	3.5 GHz 4-core (Turbo Boost up to 3.9 GHz (4690 Haswell) Intel Core i5 6 MB shared L3 cache	3.3 GHz 4-core (Turbo Boost up to 3.7 GHz) (4590 Haswell) Intel Core i5 6 MB shared L3 cache	3.1 GHz 4-core (Turbo Boost up to 3.6 GHz (5675R Broadwell) Intel Core i5 4 MB shared L3 cache and 128 MB L4 cache	3.2 GHz 4-core (Turbo Boost up to 3.6 GHz) (6500 Skylake) Intel Core i5 6 MB shared L3 cache		3.3 GHz 4-core (Turbo Boost up to 3.9 GHz) (6600 Skylake) Intel Core i5 6 MB shared L3 cache	3.0 GHz 4-core (Turbo Boost up to 3.5 GHz) (7400 Kaby Lake) Intel Core i5 6 MB shared L3 cache	3.4 GHz 4-core (Turbo Boost up to 3.8 GHz) (7500 Kaby Lake) Intel Core i5 6 MB shared L3 cache		3.5 GHz 4-core (Turbo Boost up to 4.1 GHz) (7600 Kaby Lake) Intel Core i5 6 MB shared L3 cache	3.8 GHz 4-core (Turbo Boost up to 4.2 GHz) (7600K Kaby Lake) Intel Core i5 6 MB shared L3 cache	3.6 GHz 4-core (8100 Coffee Lake) Intel Core i3 6 MB shared L3 cache	3.0 GHz 6-core (Turbo Boost up to 4.1 GHz) (8500 Coffee Lake) Intel Core i5 9 MB shared L3 cache		3.1 GHz 6-core (Turbo Boost up to 4.3 GHz) (8600 Coffee Lake) Intel Core i5 9 MB shared L3 cache	3.7 GHz 6-core (Turbo Boost up to 4.6 GHz) (9600K Coffee Lake) Intel Core i5 9 MB shared L3 cache	3.1 GHz 6-core (Turbo Boost up to 4.5 GHz) (10500 Comet Lake) Intel Core i5 12 MB shared L3 cache	3.3 GHz 6-core (Turbo Boost up to 4.8 GHz) (10600 Comet Lake) Intel Core i5 12 MB shared L3 cache	3.8 GHz 8-core (Turbo Boost up to 5.0 GHz) (10700K Comet Lake) Intel Core i7 16 MB shared L3 cache
Processor	Optional: 4 GHz 4-core (Turbo Boost up to 4.4 GHz) Haswell Intel Core i7 8 MB shared L3 cache	—N/a	Optional: 3.3 GHz 4-core (Turbo Boost up to 3.8 GHz) Broadwell Intel Core i7 6 MB shared L3 cache and 128 MB L4 cache	—N/a	Optional: 4 GHz 4-core (Turbo Boost up to 4.2 GHz) Skylake Intel Core i7 8 MB shared L3 cache		Optional: 3.6 GHz 4-core (Turbo Boost up to 4.2 GHz) Kaby Lake Intel Core i7 8 MB shared L3 cache (i7 7700)		—N/a	Optional: 4.2 GHz 4-core (Turbo Boost up to 4.5 GHz) Kaby Lake Intel Core i7 8 MB shared L3 cache (i7 7700K)		Optional: 3.2 GHz 6-core (Turbo Boost up to 4.6 GHz) Coffee Lake Intel Core i7 12 MB Cache (i7 8700)		—N/a	Optional: 3.6 GHz 8-core (Turbo Boost up to 5 GHz) Coffee Lake Intel Core i9-9900K w/ 16 MB Cache		—N/a	Optional: 3.6 GHz 10-core (Turbo Boost up to 5 GHz) Comet Lake Intel Core i9-10910 w/20 MB Cache	
System bus	Intel Direct Media Interface 2.0			Intel Direct Media Interface 3.0															
Memory	8 GB (two 4 GB, two slots empty); Optional: 16 or 32 GB		8 GB (soldered on board); Optional: 16 GB	8 GB (two 4 GB, two slots empty); Optional:16, 32 GB, expandable to 64 GB with third party modules.			8 GB (two 4 GB), non-user-accessible AASP Installable Slot; Optional: 16 GB, expandable to 64 GB with third-party modules.	8 GB (two 4 GB), non-user-accessible AASP Installable Slot; Optional:16 or 32 GB, expandable to 64 GB with third-party modules.	8 GB (two 4 GB, two slots empty); Optional: 16 or 32 GB, expandable to 64 GB with third party modules.	8 GB (two 4 GB, two slots empty); Optional: 16, 32, 64 GB		8 GB (two 4 GB), non-user-accessible AASP Installable Slot; Optional: 16 or 32 GB, expandable to 64 GB with third party modules.		8 GB (two 4 GB, two slots empty); Optional: 16 or 32 GB, expandable to 128 GB with third-party modules.	8 GB (two 4 GB, two slots empty); Optional: 16, 32, 64 GB, expandable to 128 GB with third party modules.		8 GB (two 4 GB, two slots empty); Optional: 16, 32, 64 GB, expandable to 128 GB		
Memory	1600 MHz PC3-12800 DDR3 SO-DIMM SDRAM		1867 MHz PC3-14900 LPDDR3 SDRAM (soldered on-board)	1867 MHz PC3-14900 DDR3L SO-DIMM SDRAM			2400 MHz PC4-19200 DDR4 SO-DIMM SDRAM						2666 MHz PC4-21300 DDR4 SO-DIMM SDRAM						
Graphics	AMD Radeon R9 M290X with 2 GB GDDR5 SDRAM; 30-bit Deep Color; Optional: AMD Radeon R9 M295X with 4 GB GDDR5 SDRAM	AMD Radeon R9 M290 with 2 GB GDDR5 SDRAM; 30-bit Deep Color	Intel Iris Pro Graphics 6200	AMD Radeon R9 M380 with 2 GB GDDR5 SDRAM; 30-bit Deep Color	AMD Radeon R9 M390 with 2 GB GDDR5 SDRAM; 30-bit Deep Color	AMD Radeon R9 M395 with 2 GB GDDR5 SDRAM; 30-bit Deep Color; Optional: AMD Radeon R9 M395X with 4 GB GDDR5 SDRAM	Radeon Pro 555 with 2 GB GDDR5 SDRAM	Radeon Pro 560 with 4 GB GDDR5 SDRAM	Radeon Pro 570 with 4 GB GDDR5 SDRAM	Radeon Pro 575 with 4 GB GDDR5 SDRAM	Radeon Pro 580 with 8 GB GDDR5 SDRAM	Radeon Pro 555X with 2 GB GDDR5 SDRAM	Radeon Pro 560X with 4 GB GDDR5 SDRAM Optional: Radeon Pro Vega 20 with 4 GB HBM2 memory	Radeon Pro 570X with 4 GB GDDR5 SDRAM	Radeon Pro 575X with 4 GB GDDR5 SDRAM	Radeon Pro 580X with 8 GB GDDR5 SDRAM Optional: Radeon Pro Vega 48 with 8 GB HBM2 memory	Radeon Pro 5300 with 4 GB GDDR6 SDRAM		Radeon Pro 5500 XT with 8 GB GDDR6 SDRAM Optional: Radeon Pro 5700 with 8 GB GDDR6 SDRAM or Radeon Pro 5700 XT with 16 GB GDDR6 SDRAM
Storage / Hard drive	1 TB Fusion; Optional: 3 TB Fusion, 256, 512 GB, 1 TB SSD	1 TB; Optional: 3 TB HDD, 1 or 3 TB Fusion, 256, 512 GB, or 1 TB SSD	1 TB; Optional: 1 or 2 TB Fusion, 256 or 512 GB SSD	1 TB; Optional: 3 TB HDD, 1, 2, 3 TB Fusion, 256, 512 GB SSD	1 TB Fusion; Optional: 2 or 3 TB Fusion, 256, 512 GB, 1 TB SSD	2 TB Fusion; Optional: 3 TB Fusion, 256, 512 GB, or 1 TB SSD	1 TB; Optional: 1 TB Fusion, 256 or 512 GB SSD	1 TB Fusion; Optional: 256, 512 GB or 1 TB SSD	1 TB Fusion; Optional: 2 TB Fusion, 256, 512 GB or 1 TB SSD	1 TB Fusion; Optional: 2, 3 TB Fusion, 256, 512 GB, 1 TB SSD	2 TB Fusion; Optional: 3 TB Fusion, 512 GB, 1, or 2 TB SSD	1 TB; Optional: 1 TB Fusion, 256, 512 GB, 1 TB SSD; After Aug 4, 2020: 256 GB SSD Optional: 1 TB Fusion, 512 GB, 1 TB SSD; After Mar 20, 2021: 256 GB SSD Optional: 1 TB Fusion	1 TB Fusion; Optional: 256, 512 GB, or 1 TB SSD; After Aug 4, 2020: 256 GB SSD Optional: 1 TB Fusion, 512 GB, 1 TB SSD; After Mar 20, 2021: 256 GB SSD Optional: 1 TB Fusion	1 TB Fusion; Optional: 2 TB Fusion, 256, 512 GB, or 1 TB SSD	1 TB Fusion; Optional: 2, 3 TB Fusion, 256, 512 GB, 1 TB SSD	2 TB Fusion; Optional: 3 TB Fusion, 512 GB, 1, 2 TB SSD	256 GB SSD	512 GB SSD; Optional: 1, 2 TB SSD	512 GB SSD; Optional: 1, 2, 4, 8 TB SSD
Storage / Hard drive	Serial ATA 7200 rpm and PCI-e for SSD		Serial ATA 5400 rpm and PCI-e for SSD	Serial ATA 7200 rpm and PCI-e for SSD			Serial ATA 5400 rpm	Serial ATA 5400 rpm and PCI-e for SSD	Serial ATA 7200 rpm and PCI-e for SSD			Serial ATA 5400 rpm and PCI-e for SSD		Serial ATA 7200 rpm and PCI-e for SSD			soldered on board		
Security Chip	None																Apple T2		
Connectivity	Internal AirPort Extreme 802.11a/b/g/n/ac Gigabit Ethernet; Bluetooth 4.0						Internal AirPort Extreme 802.11a/b/g/n/ac Gigabit Ethernet; Bluetooth 4.2										Internal AirPort Extreme 802.11a/b/g/n/ac Gigabit Ethernet; Bluetooth 5.0; Optional: 10 Gigabit Ethernet		
Camera	720p FaceTime HD camera																1080p FaceTime HD camera		
Video out	Up to two 4096 x 2304 (4K UHD) displays or one 5120 x 2880 (5K) dual-cable display						Up to two 4096 x 2304 (4K UHD) displays or one 5120 x 2880 (5K) display					Up to two 4096 x 2304 (4K UHD) displays with support for millions of colors or one 6016 x 3384 (6K) display with support for 1 billion colors							In addition: Up to two 6016 x 3384 (6K) displays with support for billions of colors w/ Radeon Pro 5700 or Radeon Pro 5700 XT
Peripherals	4× USB 3.0; SDXC card slot Headphone/digital audio output 2× Thunderbolt 2 ports Mini DisplayPort to VGA, DVI, HDMI, and DisplayPort adapters available Kensington Lock Slot						4× USB 3.0; SDXC card slot Headphone audio output 2× Thunderbolt 3 (USB-C 3.1 gen 2) ports Kensington Lock Slot										4× USB 3.0; SDXC card slot (UHS-II); Headphone audio output 2× Thunderbolt 3 (USB-C 3.1 gen 2) ports Kensington Lock Slot		
Weight	21 lbs (9.54 kg)		12 lbs (5.68 kg)	21 lbs (9.54 kg)			12 lbs (5.68 kg)		21 lbs (9.54 kg)			12 lbs (5.68 kg)		21 lbs (9.54 kg)			19.7 lbs (8.92 kg)		
Minimum operating system	OS X 10.10 Yosemite		OS X 10.11 El Capitan				macOS 10.12 Sierra					macOS 10.14 Mojave					macOS 10.15 Catalina		
Latest release operating system	macOS 11 Big Sur		macOS 12 Monterey				macOS 13 Ventura					macOS 15 Sequoia					macOS Tahoe 26.7		
Latest release operating system	Unofficially, macOS Tahoe can be installed with OpenCore Legacy Patcher (OCLP).											macOS 15 Sequoia					macOS Tahoe 26.7		

=== iMac Pro (2017) ===
iMac Pro

At WWDC 2017, Apple announced a higher-end version of the iMac called the iMac Pro. After the cylindrical Mac Pro redesign went years without any update, the iMac Pro was introduced as the interim Pro desktop in Apple's lineup before the revised Mac Pro shipped in 2019.

The iMac Pro is nearly identical to the 27-inch Retina iMac, albeit in a darker finish. Apple redesigned the internals to provide cooling for workstation Intel Xeon processors and AMD Vega graphics. The iMac Pro also has more connectivity options than the iMac, with four Thunderbolt 3 (USB-C) ports, four USB-A ports, a headphone jack, an SDXC card slot, and a 10 Gigabit Ethernet port, a first for an iMac. The iMac Pro has IEEE 802.11ac Wi-Fi and Bluetooth 5.0 wireless networking built in. It is the first Mac equipped with Apple's T2 security chip. The iMac Pro was discontinued in March 2021, and was replaced by the revised Mac Pro, the 2020 27-inch iMac, and eventually the Mac Studio.

== Supported operating systems ==
Supported macOS releases
OS release	Polycarbonate			Aluminum			Unibody			Slim unibody			Retina					
OS release	Early 2006	Mid 2006	Late 2006	Mid 2007	Early 2008	Early 2009	Late 2009	Mid 2010	Mid 2011	Late 2012	Late 2013	Mid 2014	Late 2014	Mid 2015	Late 2015 (Note: Includes 21.5" non-Retina models released in the same date (Late 2015 and Mid 2017))	2017	2019	2020
10.4 Tiger	10.4.4	10.4.7		10.4.10	—N/a	—N/a	—N/a	—N/a	—N/a	—N/a	—N/a	—N/a	—N/a	—N/a	—N/a	—N/a	—N/a	—N/a
10.5 Leopard	Yes	Yes	Yes	Yes	10.5.2	10.5.6	—N/a	—N/a	—N/a	—N/a	—N/a	—N/a	—N/a	—N/a	—N/a	—N/a	—N/a	—N/a
10.6 Snow Leopard	Requires 1 GB RAM or more		Yes	Yes	Yes	Yes	Yes	10.6.3	10.6.6	—N/a	—N/a	—N/a	—N/a	—N/a	—N/a	—N/a	—N/a	—N/a
10.7 Lion	patch, requires processor upgrade		Requires 2 GB RAM or more			Yes	Yes	Yes	Yes	—N/a	—N/a	—N/a	—N/a	—N/a	—N/a	—N/a	—N/a	—N/a
10.8 Mountain Lion	patch, requires processor upgrade		patch	Requires 2 GB RAM or more		Yes	Yes	Yes	Yes	10.8.1	10.8.4	—N/a	—N/a	—N/a	—N/a	—N/a	—N/a	—N/a
10.9 Mavericks	patch, requires processor upgrade		patch	Requires 2 GB RAM or more		Yes	Yes	Yes	Yes	Yes	Yes	10.9.3	—N/a	—N/a	—N/a	—N/a	—N/a	—N/a
10.10 Yosemite	patch, requires processor upgrade, no graphics acceleration		patch, no graphics acceleration	Requires 2 GB RAM or more		Yes	Yes	Yes	Yes	Yes	Yes	Yes	Yes	10.10.3	—N/a	—N/a	—N/a	—N/a
10.11 El Capitan	patch, requires processor upgrade, no graphics acceleration		patch, no graphics acceleration	Requires 2 GB RAM or more		Yes	Yes	Yes	Yes	Yes	Yes	Yes	Yes	Yes	Yes	—N/a	—N/a	—N/a
10.12 Sierra	No	No	No	patch, requires processor upgrade	patch		Yes	Yes	Yes	Yes	Yes	Yes	Yes	Yes	Yes	10.12.5	—N/a	—N/a
10.13 High Sierra	No	No	No	patch, requires processor upgrade	patch		Yes	Yes	Yes	Yes	Yes	Yes	Yes	Yes	Yes	Yes	—N/a	—N/a
10.14 Mojave	No	No	No	patch, requires processor upgrade	patch					Yes	Yes	Yes	Yes	Yes	Yes	Yes	10.14.3	—N/a
10.15 Catalina	No	No	No	patch, requires processor upgrade	patch					Yes	Yes	Yes	Yes	Yes	Yes	Yes	Yes	10.15.6
11 Big Sur	No	No	No	patch, requires processor upgrade	patch							Yes	Yes	Yes	Yes	Yes	Yes	Yes
12 Monterey	No	No	No	patch, requires processor upgrade	patch										Yes	Yes	Yes	Yes
13 Ventura	No	No	No	patch, requires processor upgrade	patch											Yes	Yes	Yes
14 Sonoma	No	No	No	patch, requires processor upgrade	patch												Yes	Yes
15 Sequoia	No	No	No	patch, requires processor upgrade	patch (Photos app currently not functional with non-Metal graphics card)					patch							Yes	Yes
26 Tahoe (Note: macOS Tahoe is the final release of macOS to support Intel-based Macs.)	No	No	No	No	No	No	No	No	No	No	No	No	No	No	No	No	No	Yes
27 Golden Gate	No	No	No	No	No	No	No	No	No	No	No	No	No	No	No	No	No	No

Supported Windows versions
OS release	Polycarbonate		Aluminum	Unibody			Slim unibody	Retina		
OS release	Early 2006	Mid 2006-Early 2009		Late 2009	Mid 2010	Mid 2011	Late 2012-Mid 2015		Late 2015	2017–2020
Windows XP 32-bit (Note: Windows XP can only be installed on Macs built up until late 2009 with Boot Camp 3 or earlier, excluding the late 2009 high-end 27-inch model. This includes Mac OS X 10.6 or earlier and copies of Mac OS X 10.7 that have not been updated to Boot Camp 4.)	Yes	Yes	Yes	Partial	No	No	No	No	No	No
Windows Vista 32-bit (Note: Windows Vista can only be installed on Macs built up until late 2009 with Boot Camp 3 or earlier, excluding the late 2009 high-end 27-inch model. This includes Mac OS X 10.6 or earlier and copies of Mac OS X 10.7 that have not been updated to Boot Camp 4.)	Yes	Yes	Yes	Partial	No	No	No	No	No	No
Windows Vista 64-bit	No	Yes	Yes		No	No	No	No	No	No
Windows 7 32-bit (Note: The 32-bit version of Windows 7 can only be installed on Macs with Boot Camp 3.1 to 6.0. This includes OS X 10.11 and earlier.)	No	Yes	Yes	Yes	Yes	Yes	No	No	No	No
Windows 7 64-bit (Note: The 64-bit version of Windows 7 can only be installed on Macs with Boot Camp 3.1 or later, running macOS High Sierra or earlier. Later versions of macOS no longer support Windows 7.)	No	No	No	Yes	Yes	Yes	Yes	Yes	No	No
Windows 8 (Note: Windows 8 can only be installed on Macs with Boot Camp 5.0 to 6.0. This includes OS X 10.11 and earlier.) (Note: Only 64-bit versions of Windows are supported for Windows 8 and later.)	No	No	No	No	Yes	Yes	Yes	Yes	Yes	No
Windows 8.1 (Note: Windows 8.1 can only be installed on Macs with Boot Camp 5.1 or later, running macOS High Sierra or earlier. Later versions of macOS no longer support Windows 8.1.)	No	No	No	No	Yes	Yes	Yes	Yes	Yes	No
Windows 10 (Note: Windows 10 can only be installed on Macs with Boot Camp 6.0 or later. It is the only supported version of Windows on macOS Mojave and later.)	No	No	No	No	No	No	Yes	Yes	Yes	Yes
Windows 11	No	No	No	No	No	No	No	Partial	Yes	Yes

== Timeline of iMac models ==
Timeline of iMac and eMac models
See also: List of Mac models
