= EMac =

All-in-one desktop computer made by Apple

eMac

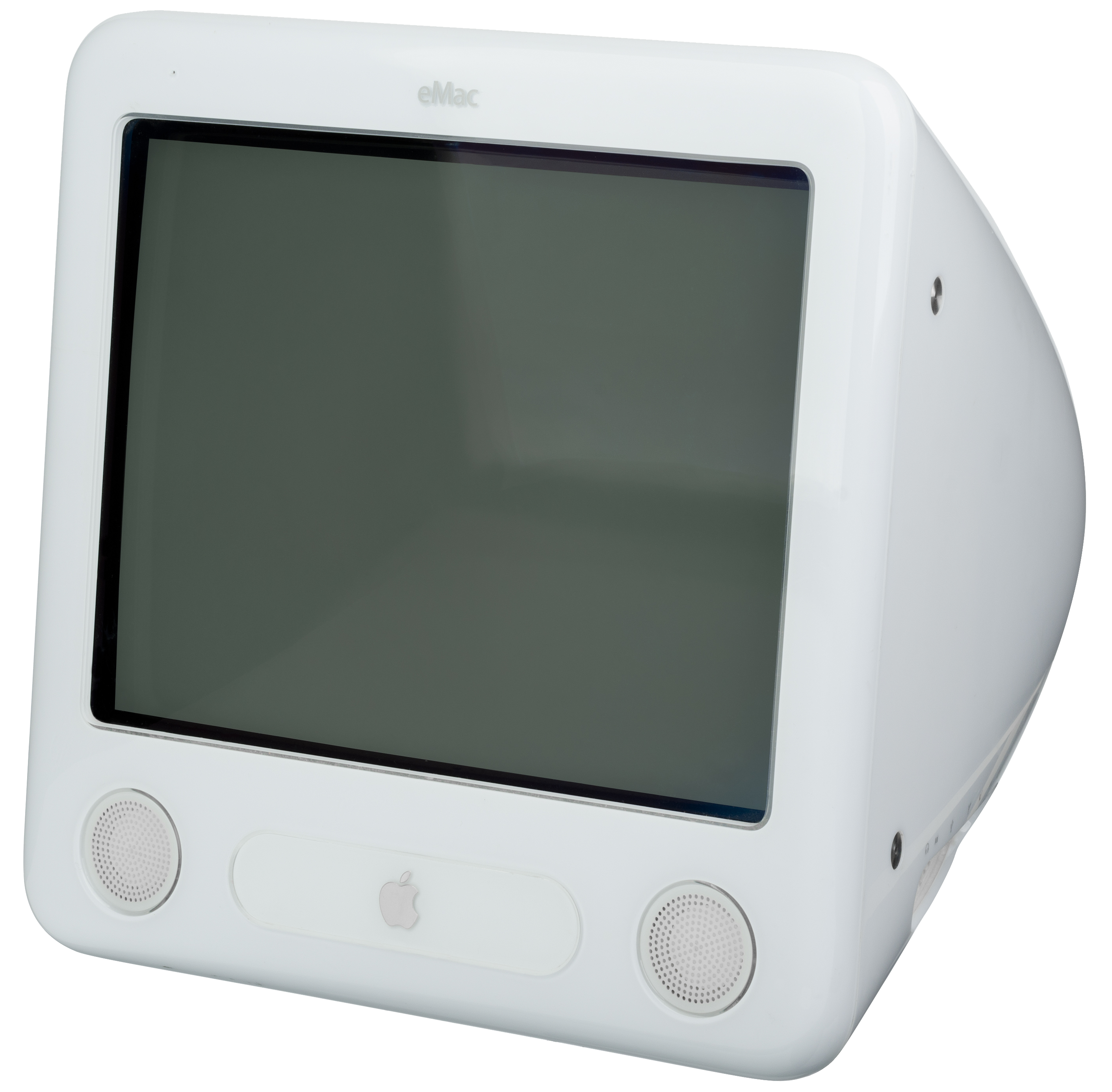
- The Apple eMac
- Developer: Apple Computer
- Type: All-in-one
- Released: April 29, 2002; 24 years ago
- Introductory price: US$1,099 (equivalent to $1,970 in 2025)
- Discontinued: July 5, 2006; 20 years ago
- CPU: PowerPC 7450, 700 MHz–1.42 GHz
- Display: 17 in (43 cm) flat CRT, 1280 x 960
- Weight: 55 lb (25 kg)
- Predecessor: iMac G3
- Successor: Intel iMac
- Made in: USA, China

The eMac ("e" short for education) is a discontinued all-in-one Mac desktop computer that was produced and designed by Apple Computer. Released in 2002, it was originally aimed at the education market but was later made available as a cheaper mass-market alternative to Apple's "Sunflower" iMac G4. The eMac was pulled from retail on October 12, 2005, and was again sold exclusively to educational institutions thereafter. It was discontinued by Apple on July 5, 2006, and replaced by a cheaper, low-end Intel iMac that, like the eMac, was exclusively sold to educational institutions.

The eMac design closely resembles the Snow iMac G3, though the eMac was not available in any color other than white, it was slightly larger in size, did not include a carry handle, and was heavier than the preceding G3, weighing 55 lb (25 kg). The unique shape of the computer was also similar to Apple's last CRT-based 17-inch Studio Display, released in 2000 (the last standalone CRT monitor Apple made). The Apple eMac features a PowerPC 7450 (G4e) processor that is significantly faster than the previous-generation PowerPC 750 (G3) processor, as well as a 17-inch flat LG or CPT-made CRT display which was less expensive and more rugged for the education market, making it a similar-performing alternative to the more premium iMac G4 with its LCD.

== Background ==
In 1998, Apple released the iMac G3, an all-in-one computer built around a cathode-ray tube display. The iMac was a major success for Apple, selling more than five million units; it also sold for as low as US$799, making it the most affordable Mac model Apple offered. In January 2002, Apple announced a successor to the iMac G3, the iMac G4. This iMac was built around a floating flat-panel display, and started at a higher price than the previous generation. While a few models of the iMac G3 remained at lower price points, they lacked power for educational tasks like video. Education customers made up nearly a quarter of Apple's sales, and with Windows-based computers eating into Apple's market share of the sector, Apple consulted with educators to build a cheaper G4-powered successor for the price-conscious market.

Apple announced the eMac on April 29, 2002, to be sold only to education markets. Apple had previously created education-only computer models, including the iMac predecessor Power Macintosh G3 All-In-One. The machine's CRT screen made it cheaper than the iMac G4 (the most expensive configuration was still cheaper than the cheapest iMac G4), and its bulk was intended to make it more resilient to wear and tear in a school setting than the fragile hinge and flat screen of the iMac.

== Design ==
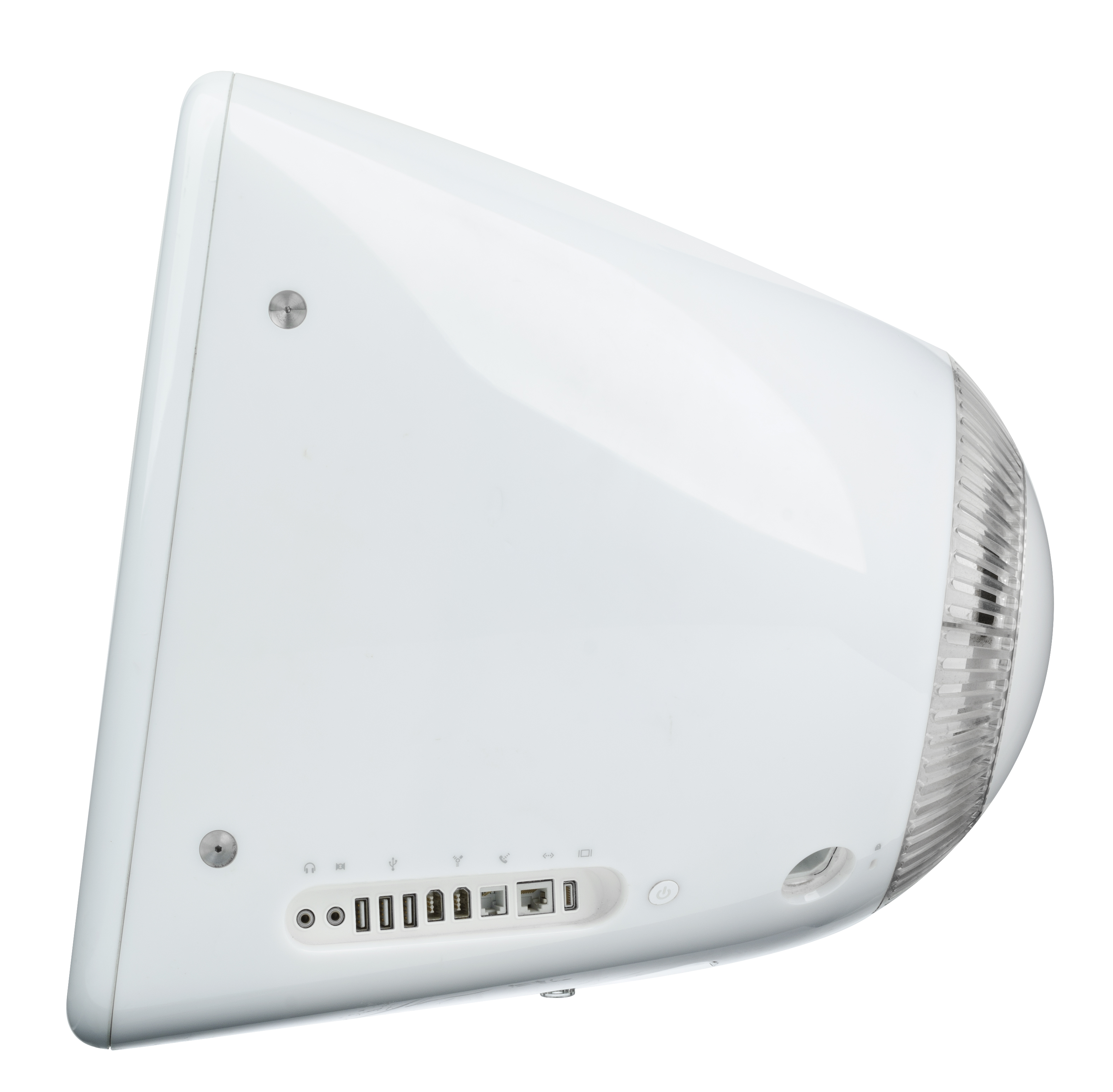
Side view. The right side of the computer houses the I/O ports.

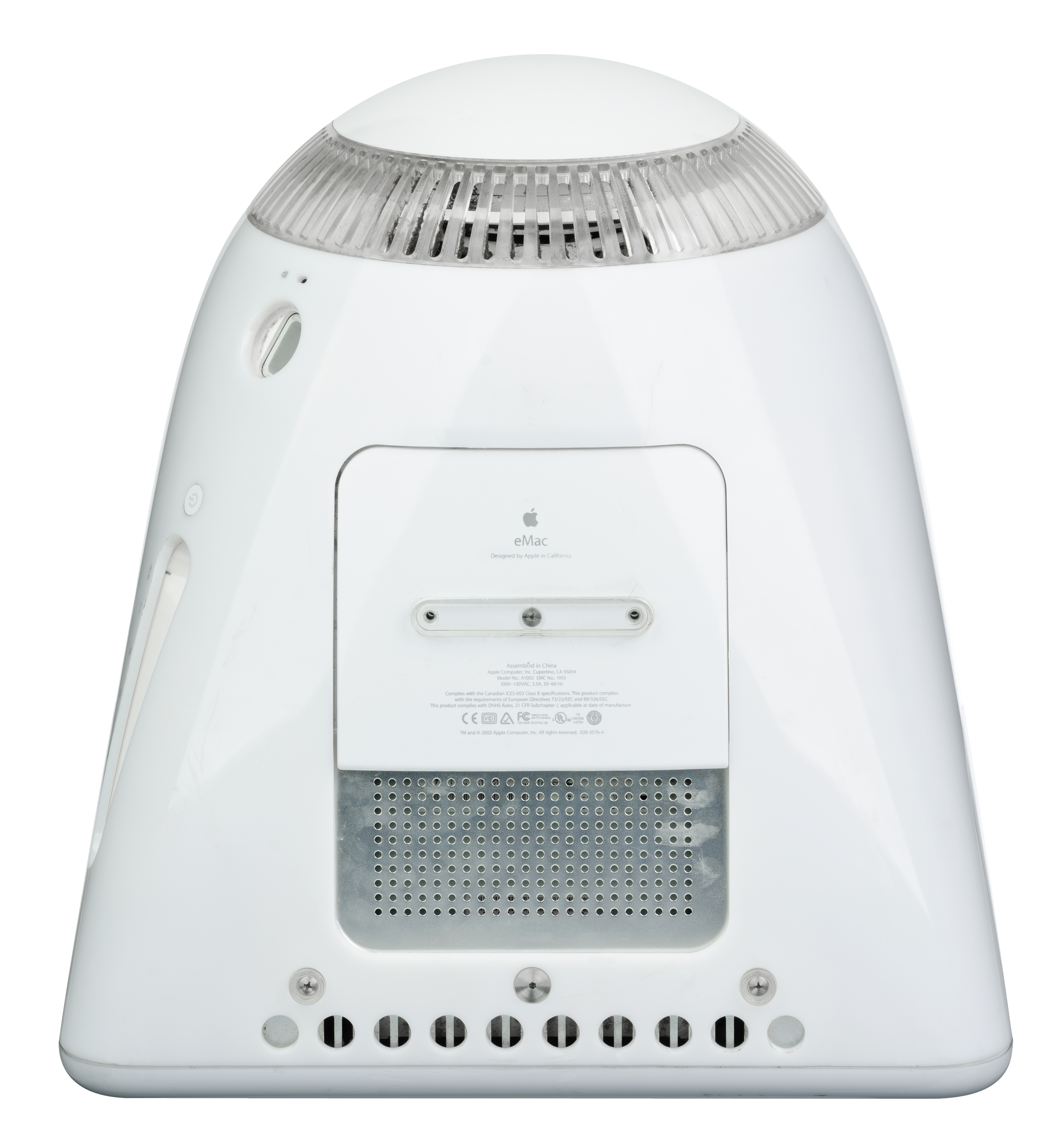
Bottom view. The bottom features a service hatch for upgrading the computer's memory.

The eMac has a substantially similar design to the iMac G3, but features a larger 17-inch (430 mm) (16-inch viewable) flat-screen CRT monitor. The larger screen has 40 percent more viewing area than the iMac. Thanks to the short-necked CRT, it takes up the same space as the iMac—in fact, it is a few millimeters shorter–but also is heavier, at 50 pounds (23 kg). The computer is powered by a PowerPC G4 processor much faster than the G3-powered iMacs. The machine's serial number and networking identification are printed on the front of the computer behind the optical drive door, intended to make it easier for schools to track purchases. RAM can be upgraded through a service hatch at the bottom of the computer. Apple sold a separate acrylic tilt-and-swivel stand to enable changing the viewing angle of the screen.

== Release ==
After demand from consumers, Apple announced on June 4, 2002 that the eMac would be available through general retail. Regular consumers did not get the same prices and configuration options as education customers; for example, education buyers could get a model without a modem.

The eMac generally catered to the mass market, eventually taking over the entry-level (previously held by the iMac G3) Macintosh from 2003 to 2005, while the iMac G4 was positioned as a premium offering throughout the lifetime of the eMac line. The eMac generally offered similar performance and features to the iMac G4 while they were sold side by side. The eMac was gradually supplanted by the iMac G5 in 2005 to 2006.

In October 2003, the 800 MHz model was eliminated as a standard configuration and the 1 GHz model was brought down in price. This revision was the last in the line to officially run Apple's OS 9 operating system natively.

The next revision to the eMac line came in April 2004, with DDR SDRAM, a faster processor running at 1.25 GHz, and a better ATI Radeon 9200 video chipset. The most recent revision came in May 2005, with an even faster CPU running at 1.42 GHz, Radeon 9600 graphics, and larger standard hard disk.

On October 12, 2005, Apple once again restricted sales of the eMac to educational institutions and returned to its "E is for Education" marketing plan that had been attached to the product from the original restriction to education buyers. The company re-implemented this restrictive measure for unspecified reasons. Some analysts believe Apple wanted to force the general public to purchase the more expensive Mac Mini or iMac which had higher profit margins. Also, the eMac was the only CRT display product left in Apple's lineup, which made it somewhat bulky compared to new offerings which had compact form factors due to their LCD screens. The falling cost of LCD displays would also gradually bring down the prices of the iMac G5. However, the eMac was still available for sale to the general public through some third-party retailer websites.

On July 5, 2006, the entire eMac line was discontinued. An "educational configuration" of the iMac Core Duo was introduced that same day, which had a Combo drive rather than a SuperDrive and a smaller 80 GB hard disk.

Early eMac models natively boot Mac OS 9.2.2 and Mac OS X beginning with OS X 10.1.4, while later models only officially boot Mac OS X. 1 GHz and faster models cannot boot OS 9, while eMacs slower than 1 GHz do not officially support 10.5 (requirements are an 867 MHz G4 with 512 MB RAM).

== Reception ==
The eMac was generally well-received. Macworld's Jason Snell wrote that the eMac served as a worthy successor to the iMac G3. Criticism of the initial release version was that the low amount of installed RAM (128 MB) was not sufficient for Mac OS X. The eMac was as easy to setup and had performance comparable to a similarly-equipped iMac G4, making the eMac the most affordable point of entry with a Power PC G4 processor and DVD-recording.

== Technical problems ==
A number of early eMac machines have suffered from what was known as "Raster Shift", a phenomenon where the bottom third or half of the screen goes black, with the rest of image shifting upward and beyond the top boundary of the display. Serious static also accompanies the problem, rendering the viewable part of the screen virtually useless. In response to the problem, Apple offered a solution which involved the replacement of the video cable inside the eMac's case. Certain models of eMac also suffered from capacitor plague, that caused video distortion or the computer to lock up. Apple responded to these issues by implementing a warranty extension program.

== Technical specifications ==
All are standard configurations from Apple unless otherwise noted.

Model	eMac		eMac (ATI Graphics)		eMac (USB 2.0)	eMac (2005)
Released	April 29, 2002	August 13, 2002	May 6, 2003		April 13, 2004	May 3, 2005
Discontinued	May 6, 2003		October 22, 2003	April 13, 2004	May 3, 2005	October 12, 2005 (retail) / July 5, 2006 (education)
Order no.	M8655	M8892	M9150	M8950	M9425	M9834
Display	17-inch (16-inch viewable) 1280 × 960 flat CRT					
Processor	700 MHz PowerPC G4	800 MHz PowerPC G4		1.0 GHz PowerPC G4	1.25 GHz PowerPC G4; 1.0 GHz for education only	1.42 GHz PowerPC G4; 1.25 GHz for education only
CPU cache	64 KB L1, 256 KB L2 (1:1)				64 KB L1, 512 KB L2 on chip (1:1)	
Front side bus	100 MHz		133 MHz		167 MHz	
Memory	128 MB PC133 SDRAM; Expandable up to 1 GB			256 MB of PC133 SDRAM; Expandable up to 1 GB	256 MB 333 MHz PC2700 DDR SDRAM (512 MB for 1.42 GHz SuperDrive model); Expandable up to 2 GB (officially only 1 GB is supported) (Note: Build to order option)	
Graphics	NVIDIA GeForce 2 MX with 32 MB DDR SDRAM		ATI Radeon 7500 with 32 MB DDR SDRAM		ATI Radeon 9200 with 32 MB DDR SDRAM	ATI Radeon 9600 with 64 MB DDR SDRAM; ATI Radeon 9200 with 32 MB DDR SDRAM for education only
Graphics	AGP 2x	AGP 4x				
Hard drive	40 GB	40 GB, 60 GB, 80 GB			40 GB, 80 GB	40 GB, 80 GB, 120 GB, 160 GB
Hard drive	Ultra ATA/66				Ultra ATA/100	
Optical drive	32x CD-ROM	2X SuperDrive (DVD-RW)	32x CD-ROM	Combo Drive (CD-RW/DVD-ROM); Optional SuperDrive (DVD-RW)		
Wireless	AirPort 802.11b (Note: Sold separately and had to be installed by end user)		AirPort Extreme 802.11b/g			
Ethernet	10/100 BASE-T Ethernet					
Modem	56k V.90 modem				56k V.92 modem (optional on education 1.25 GHz models)	
Bluetooth	—N/a				Optional Bluetooth 1.1	
USB	3x USB 1.1				3x USB 2.0	
FireWire	2x FireWire 400					
Audio	Built-in 18-watt stereo speakers				Built-in 16-watt stereo speakers	Built-in 18-watt stereo speakers
Video out	Mini-VGA at up to 1280x960 (mirrored mode only). Unofficially, can be altered to support extended display mode in models with ATI graphics using a tool called Screen Spanning Doctor.					
Original operating system	Mac OS X 10.1.4 "Puma" and Mac OS 9.2.2		Mac OS X 10.2.6 "Jaguar"; Mac OS 9.2.2	Mac OS X 10.2.6 "Jaguar"	Mac OS X 10.3.3 "Panther"	Mac OS X 10.4 "Tiger"
Maximum operating system	Mac OS X 10.4 "Tiger" and Mac OS 9.2.2			Mac OS X 10.5 "Leopard"		
Weight		50 lb / 22.7 kg				

== Timeline of eMac models ==
Timeline of iMac and eMac models
See also: List of Mac models
