= IMac G5 =

All-in-one computer by Apple

iMac G5
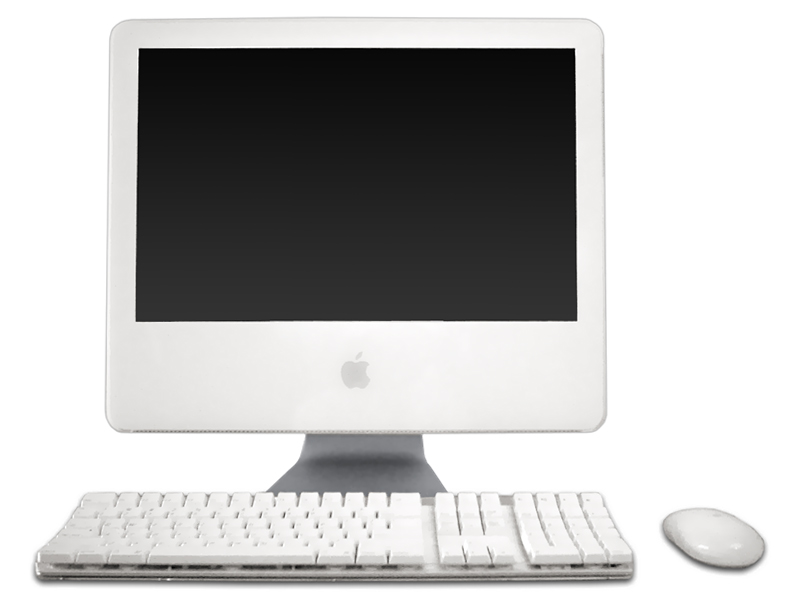
- An original iMac G5 with an Apple Wireless Mouse
- Manufacturer: Apple Computer
- Type: All-in-one
- Released: August 31, 2004; 22 years ago
- Discontinued: January 10, 2006; 20 years ago (17-inch model); March 20, 2006; 20 years ago (20-inch model)
- Predecessor: iMac G4
- Successor: Intel iMac

The iMac G5 is a series of all-in-one personal computers that was designed, manufactured and sold by Apple Computer from 2004 to 2006. The iMac G5 returned to a more traditional design after the "sunflower" iMac G4, with the computer components fitted behind a liquid-crystal display and mounted on an aluminum foot. The computer was designed around the need to cool its PowerPC 970 processor, and features an interior divided into zones for cooler, quieter operation.

The iMac G5 was announced at the Apple Expo in Paris in August 2004, and was revised twice during its lifespan before being replaced by the first iMacs based on Intel processors. The iMac G5 was well received by critics, who noted its performance, quiet operation, and ease of use. Criticisms included its port placement, lack of ergonomic adjustments, and lack of base memory. The design established by the G5 iMacs would influence the design of subsequent models.

== Overview ==
The iMac G5 is an all-in-one personal computer. The exterior is white, double-shot plastic. The machine has an integrated, flat 17-or-20-inch (43 or 51 cm) liquid-crystal display (LCD), with the rest of the computer internals mounted behind it, or in a "chin" area below the display. The enclosure is 2 inches (5.1 cm) deep on early models, and 1.5 inches (3.8 cm) on later revisions. An L-shaped aluminum foot elevates the display off the resting surface and allows the screen to be tilted between –5 and 25 degrees, though it does not offer height adjustment or side-to-side swiveling. A hole in the foot allows cables to be routed through it, and the entire foot on the early models could be removed to use another mounting method. On the top right edge of the iMac is an optical drive using a slot-loading mechanism to save space. On the back of the machine is a single row of input/output ports: analog input and analog–digital outport, Universal Serial Bus (USB), FireWire, a dial-up modem, and Ethernet. Initial models featured AirPort Express and Bluetooth wireless connectivity as optional add-ons. (Note: On the initial models, these ports are arranged vertically on the edge of the machine; on later models, this was shifted to a horizontal arrangement along the bottom edge.) The iMac features speakers powered by a 12-watt amplifier, positioned at the bottom of the machine so that sound is reflected off the resting surface towards the user.

The G5 central processing unit is located under a large heat sink. To address the processor's heat output, the interior of the iMac is divided into multiple cooling zones, with the system monitoring heat and ramping fan speeds only when needed for quieter operation. The fans draw air from the speaker grilles at the bottom of the case up through vents in the back. The graphics processing unit is integrated directly to the motherboard and thus cannot be easily upgraded. The Serial AT Attachment (SATA) hard drives and random-access memory (RAM) of the iMac were the same as the contemporaneous Power Mac G5. In initial iMac G5 models, the interior could be easily accessed through the back by the removal of three captive screws.

== Development ==
Apple introduced the iMac G4 in January 2002, the first iMac with an LCD. The 15-inch launch model was supplemented by models with 17- and 20-inch displays. These larger displays challenged the iMac G4's "sunflower" design, where the display was suspended above a base by an adjustable arm; the 20-inch model weighed almost twice as much as the 17-inch model due to the need to counterbalance the screen. The new PowerPC G5 processors that Apple first shipped with the Power Mac G5 also ran much hotter and required more cooling than the G4s they replaced; fitting them into Apple's smaller desktop machines or laptops was a special difficulty. Apple marketing executive Greg Joswiak described the heart of the iMac as its all-in-one form factor, ease of use, focus on digital lifestyle applications, and innovative design, and that revamping it always meant keeping those factors in mind.

In redesigning the iMac, Apple went with an approach they had considered and then discarded with the G4 model—attaching the components behind the display. The new design kept the tilt adjustment from the previous model, and approximating swiveling by adding rubber feet on the base so that it could be easily adjusted; height adjustment was not included, with Joswiak justifying the change by saying that few customers raised or lowered their iMacs. To address the heat of the G5 processor, Apple divided the iMac's interior into three cooling zones: the processor, the hard drive, and the power supply and logic board. "By doing the three different cooling areas, we take a big heating challenge and break it into smaller ones, which is really the essence of good thermal design," Joswiak said. This allowed the machine to have quieter fans that only ran as fast—and as loudly—as needed. The new design allowed the design team to integrate the stereo speakers into the case, which had been a design concession of the previous model. The iMac's white exterior followed the similar look of the iMac G4 and the iPod music player. Jony Ive found the color bold yet restrained.

== Release ==
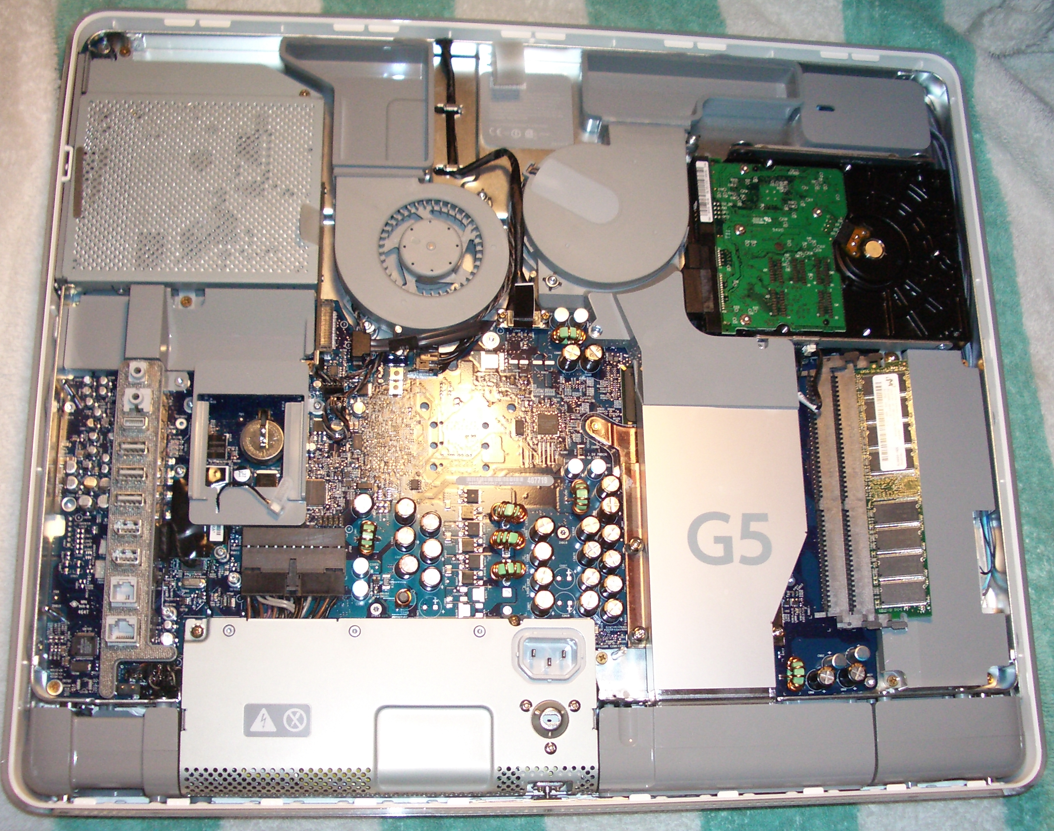
Inside the first revision of a 20-inch iMac G5

The iMac G5 was formally announced at the Paris Mac Expo on August 31, 2004, and shipped in September. Advertising for the new iMac visually linked it to the iPod, by then fast becoming Apple's most important product; advertisements for the computer placed it alongside the music player and contained the tagline "From the creators of iPod." Apple focused on selling iMacs to iPod users via the halo effect for the Apple brand. The company sought to allay concerns that the success of the iPod was to the detriment of the Mac division; "I really hope that when they see this iMac that it shows that it's not the case," Apple executive Phil Schiller told analysts. "We are applying our innovation and engineering design talents to everything we do, including the iPod and all of our Mac product lines."

The machine initially came in three configurations. A low-end 17-inch model featured a 1.6 GHz processor, 256 MB of memory, an 80 GB hard drive, and a DVD-ROM/CD-RW combo drive. A midrange model added a faster processor and the ability to burn DVDs, while the high-end model added a larger hard drive to pair with a 20-inch display. The high-end prices were hundreds of dollars less than the G4 models they replaced. Exclusively for the education market, Apple offered a cheaper model but with an inferior graphics chipset and smaller hard drive.

The iMac G5 was updated in March 2005. The new models featured faster processors, more memory, larger hard drives, improved graphics, and double-layer optical drives (capable of burning 8.5 GB DVDs). The computer's networking was also improved with Gigabit Ethernet, and AirPort and Bluetooth now standard features.

In October 2005, the iMac was revised again, with a slimmer, internally new design. The new models featured an integrated iSight webcam mounted above the LCD. The iMac shipped with a remote for use with Apple's Front Row media interface. Other improvements included faster processors, more RAM, larger hard drives, and improved graphics. SuperDrives became standard across the line. The computers also included the Apple Mighty Mouse. It became the first Apple computer to use the PCI Express expansion bus and DDR2 SDRAM. The stand could no longer be replaced with a VESA mount, and the computer no longer included modems. The internals were more difficult to access.

In January 2006, the iMac G5 was succeeded by a new line featuring Intel processors, beginning the transition of Apple's entire line of computers to the Intel architecture six months ahead of schedule. These machines were outwardly similar to the G5 models they replaced.

== Reception ==
The iMac G5 was generally positively-received. The Wall Street Journal's Walt Mossberg and The Detroit Free Press's Mike Wendland called the iMac the best computer they had ever used. Multiple publications recommended the machine as an option for Windows PC users to switch to Macs. Macworld's Jason Snell called it a glimpse of the future of where consumer computers would end up.

The New York Times's David Pogue suggested that the design of the iMac G5 was so similar to the iPod to visually entice buyers of the latter to try the all-in-one. The design was often called conservative or predictable compared to its predecessors, although Wired considered the G5's simplicity an improvement over the "freakish and odd" G4. Mossberg noted that while Apple was not the first all-in-one computer to sit behind an LCD, it was thinner and more attractive than the competition.

Its performance was often favorably compared to the more expensive Power Macs, with some critics suggesting the only reason to get the more expensive models was if consumers needed to add expansion or graphics cards. In comparison, Sound on Sound's Mark Wherry felt that an entry-level Power Mac G5 offered much more flexibility for not much more money, especially if sound designers or other audio-focused users wanted to separate the screen from the computer for noise purposes. Mossberg noted that despite the stereotype that Macs were more expensive than Windows PCs, the iMac was comparably priced to the competition. Pogue, Wendland, and Computerworld's Yuval Kossovsky noted the machine's near-inaudible operation, which Pogue considered doubly impressive given the heat generated by the high-performance internals.

In comparison to the ergonomics of the iMac G4, the iMac G5's lack of height adjustment was criticized. Other complaints included the low amount of standard memory, and the lack of forward-facing ports so that peripherals could be more easily connected. Norr felt the sound from the iMac's built-in speakers was not as good as the external speakers that shipped with the iMac G4. While the initial model's ease of repair and upgrade was praised, The iSight models' lack of repairability was also criticized as a step back. Early iMacs suffered from capacitors failing due to heat and faulty power supplies, which would result in Apple offering a repair program for the machines.

The iMac G5's design proved to be the template for successive iMac generations, with subsequent models slimming down the enclosure while growing more powerful. Designer Jordan Merrick summed up the iMac G5 as the "mature" evolution of the iMac line, with its "deliberate lack of any ostentatious characteristics" presaging the more minimalist style Apple would take with their future computers.

== Specifications ==
Model	iMac G5				iMac G5 Ambient Light Sensor			iMac G5 iSight	
Release date	August 31, 2004				May 3, 2005			October 12, 2005	
Order number	M9363 (Education only)	M9248	M9249; M9823	M9250; M9824	M9843	M9844	M9845	MA063	MA064
Display	17" LCD, 1440 × 900			20" LCD, 1680 × 1050	17" LCD, 1440 × 900		20" LCD, 1680 × 1050	17" LCD, 1440 × 900	20" LCD, 1680 × 1050
Processor	1.6 GHz		1.8 GHz			2.0 GHz		1.9 GHz	2.1 GHz
Front side bus	533 MHz		600 MHz			667 MHz		633 MHz	700 MHz
Memory	256 MB of 400 MHz PC-3200 DDR SDRAM; Expandable to 2 GB				512 MB of 400 MHz PC-3200 DDR SDRAM; Expandable to 2 GB			512 MB of 533 MHz PC2-4200 DDR2 SDRAM; Expandable to 2.5 GB (512 MB soldered)	
Graphics processor	Nvidia GeForce 4 MX with 32 MB of DDR SDRAM	Nvidia GeForce FX 5200 Ultra with 64 MB of DDR SDRAM			ATI Radeon 9600 with 128 MB of DDR SDRAM			ATI Radeon X600 Pro with 128 MB of DDR SDRAM	ATI Radeon X600 XT with 128 MB of DDR SDRAM
Graphics processor	AGP 4× (?)	AGP 8×						PCI Express	
HDD	40 GB	80 GB		160 GB			250 GB	160 GB	250 GB
HDD	Ultra ATA 7200-rpm	Serial ATA 7200-rpm							
Optical drive	None	8x Combo drive	4x SuperDrive		8x Combo drive	8x DL SuperDrive			
Network	10/100BASE-T Ethernet; Optional external 56k V.92 Modem	Optional AirPort Extreme 802.11b/g Optional Bluetooth 1.1; 10/100BASE-T Ethernet; 56k V.92 Modem			AirPort Extreme and Bluetooth 2.0 + EDR; Gigabit Ethernet; 56k V.92 Modem			AirPort Extreme and Bluetooth 2.0 + EDR; Gigabit Ethernet; Built-in infrared (IR) receiver for Apple Remote	
Peripherals	3× USB 2.0; 2× FireWire 400; Audio input and audio output								
Camera	None							Integrated iSight Camera	
Video out	Mini-VGA								
Original operating system	Mac OS X Panther 10.3				Mac OS X Tiger 10.4				
Maximum operating system	Mac OS X Leopard 10.5 if 512 MB RAM installed, otherwise Mac OS X Tiger 10.4							Mac OS X Leopard 10.5	
Weight	17": 18.5 pounds (8.4 kg), 20": 25.2 pounds (11.4 kg)							17": 15.5 pounds (7.0 kg), 20": 22 pounds (10.0 kg)	
