= IMac G4 =

All-in-one computer by Apple

iMac G4
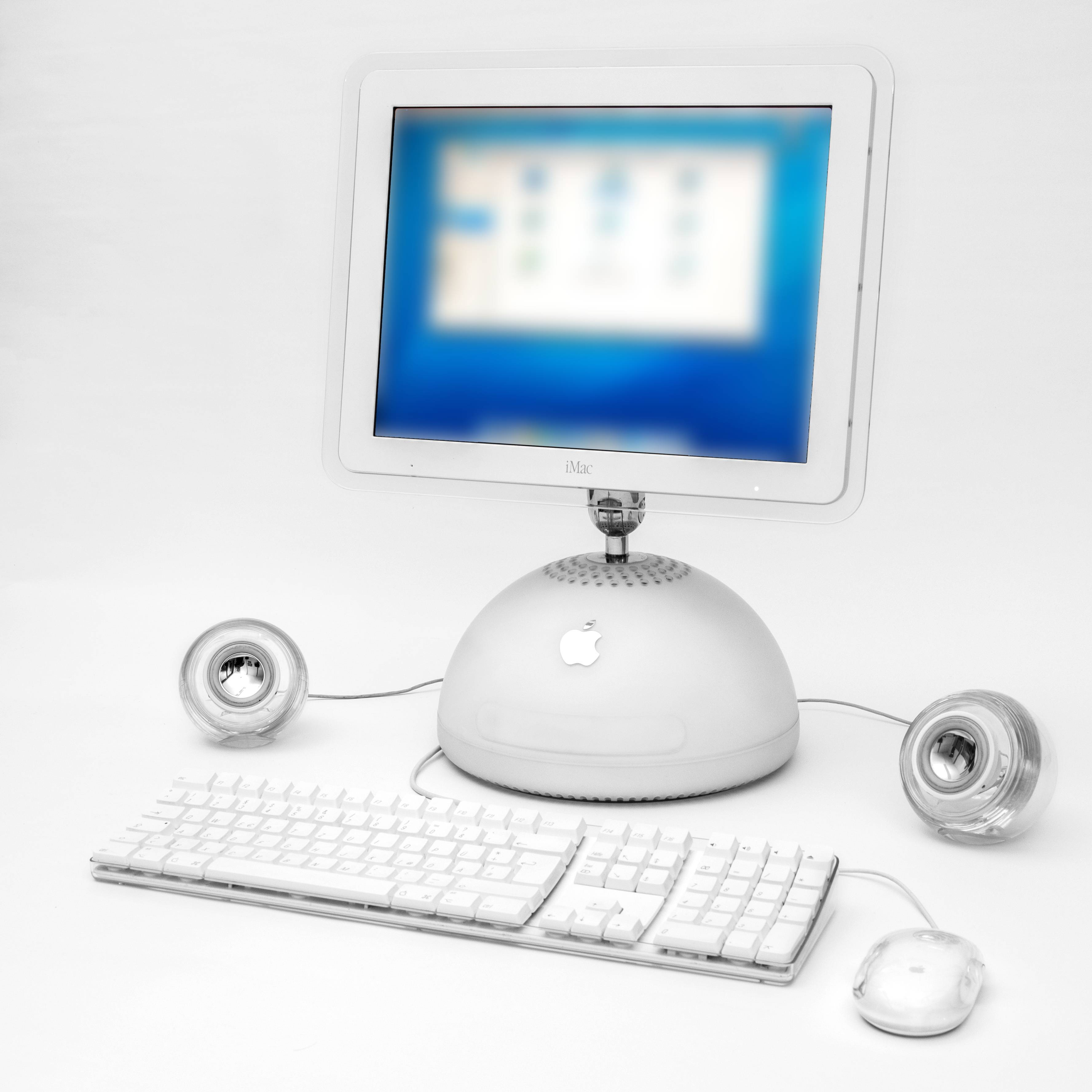
- 15-inch iMac G4 with speakers and peripherals
- Manufacturer: Apple Computer
- Product family: iMac
- Type: All-in-one
- Released: January 7, 2002; 24 years ago
- Discontinued: August 31, 2004; 22 years ago
- Predecessor: iMac G3
- Successor: iMac G5
- Made in: United States

The iMac G4 (Note: When released, the iMac G4 was referred to as "the new iMac" to distinguish itself from the previous CRT-based models; they would retroactively be called iMac G3 and iMac G4 to distinguish them.) is a personal computer designed, manufactured, and sold by Apple Computer from January 2002 to August 2004. The all-in-one computer comprises a hemispheric base that holds the components, including a PowerPC G4 processor, and a flatscreen liquid-crystal display (LCD) mounted above. The display is connected to the base via an adjustable arm that allows the monitor to be tilted and swiveled.

Apple's previous release, the iMac G3 (1998), was a commercial success at a time when the company was close to bankruptcy. As component prices fell, Apple envisioned a replacement that would use an LCD instead of the G3's bulky cathode-ray tube. The resulting iMac G4 took two years to develop. The new shape was inspired by a sunflower, with Apple's design team exploring different ways of attaching the monitor to the base before settling on a single stainless steel arm. The iMac G4 eschewed the colorful translucency of the iMac G3 in favor of opaque white with silver accents.

The iMac G4 was announced at the Macworld San Francisco trade show on January 7, 2002, and began shipping that month. It was updated over the years with faster internal components and larger LCDs. The iMac G4 was a critical and commercial success, selling more than 1.3 million units in its first year and roughly 3.1 million units alongside the eMac in its lifetime. It was succeeded by the iMac G5 in 2004, which replaced the G4's bold design language with a more conservative look that influenced later iMac models.

== Overview ==
The iMac G4, originally marketed as "the new iMac", is an all-in-one personal computer. The machine has an integrated, flatscreen, liquid-crystal display (LCD) mounted on an adjustable stainless steel arm. The arm allows the display to tilt up and down across 35 degrees, swivel the monitor 180 degrees side to side, and raise or lower it by 7 inches (18 cm). A clear plastic "halo" frames the display. The 10.6-inch (27 cm) diameter hemispherical base that contains the computer components is heavy enough to support the display, with the neck strong enough to support the weight of the entire computer for carrying. The machine is designed for ease of use; the included instructions consist only of six pictures.

The iMac G4 is powered by a PowerPC G4 processor similar to the one in the Power Mac G4, albeit missing 1 MB of L3 cache. The computer has a quiet fan to cool the G4 processor through vents at the top of the base, unlike the iMac G3, which was cooled via convection. The power button, power plug, and input/output ports are arranged on the back of the base, while the tray-loading optical drive sits in front, sporting a mirror finish Apple logo. The power supply is also integrated into the base. The machine features three Universal Serial Bus ports, two IEEE 1394 (Firewire) ports, Video Graphics Array (VGA) out, 100 Mbit/s Ethernet and 56 kbit/s modem connections. After-purchase expansion is limited to additional random access memory or an AirPort wireless networking card; these are added by removing an access plate secured with captive screws on the underside of the base.

The machine was initially sold with the Apple Pro Keyboard and Apple Pro Mouse in white. While the iMac has a built-in speaker, some models shipped with external Apple Pro Speakers, introduced for the "Digital Audio" Power Mac G4. These use a proprietary connector instead of a 3.5mm headphone jack and have a higher output signal. The iMac G4 was the first Mac to boot by default into Mac OS X, although it can also boot into OS 9 to use older software. Pre-installed software included productivity applications (AppleWorks, iPhoto, iMovie, iTunes, iDVD, Quicken, and FaxSTF) internet connectivity services (Earthlink and AOL), the Pangea Software game Otto Matic, and World Book Encyclopedia.

== Development ==
The iMac G3 was released in 1998 and was a major success for Apple; it sparked a 400% rise in the company's stock price over the next two years and sold six million units. It helped reverse Apple's financial fortunes, marked the first major collaboration between returning CEO Steve Jobs and head of design Jony Ive, and was manufactured using new methodologies at Apple that would be applied to their future products. After the iMac's release, Apple revamped its product offerings for other consumer segments, including the Power Mac G3 and G4 and the iBook. Apple's industrial designers increasingly held more sway, and the engineering department saw significant turnover in the wake of the industrial design group's demands. In 2001, the design team moved from a separate building to a new space at the company's headquarters, offering a larger area to generate ideas, prototype models, and showcase them to Jobs.

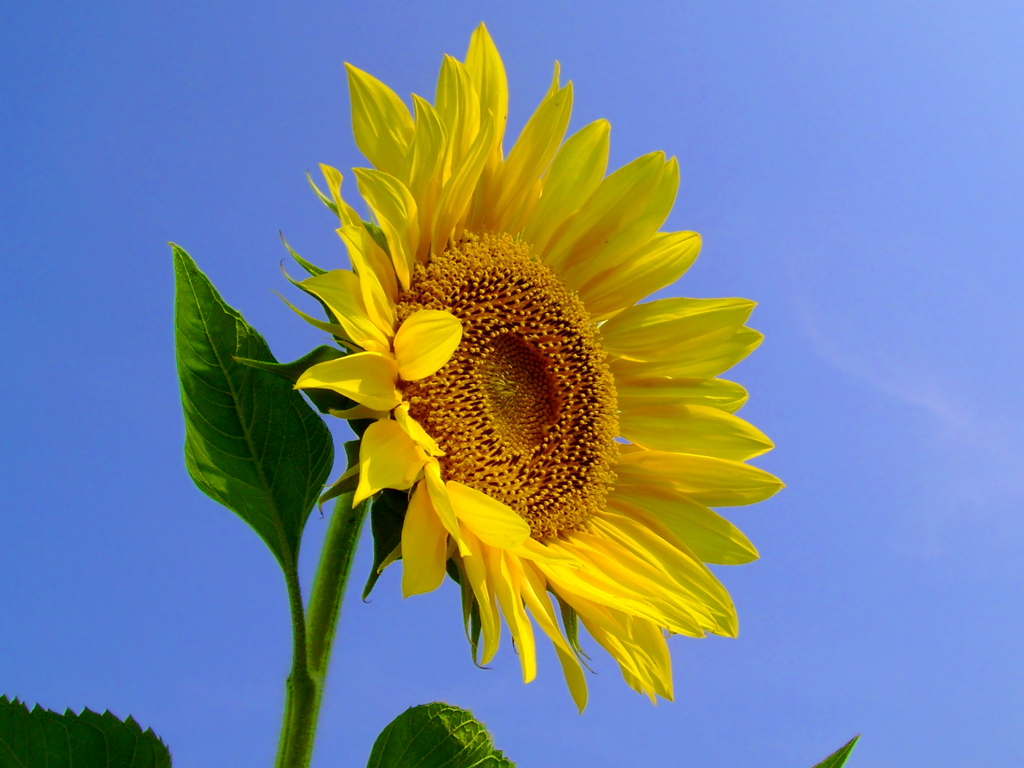
Sunflowers provided inspiration for the iMac G4's design.

Eighteen months after the iMac's release, Ive's team began considering a redesign that swapped the computer's bulky cathode-ray tube screen, around which the computer was designed, with a thin, flat liquid-crystal display (LCD). Ive produced a prototype that attached the computer components behind the screen, similar to his work on the Twentieth Anniversary Macintosh. The design came with drawbacks; the hard drive and optical drive would be less performant in a vertical orientation, and the added heat produced by the G4 processor would necessitate a noisy fan that would be positioned close to the user. There would also be no easy way to tilt and swivel the display without moving the entire machine. Jobs hated the design, which he felt lacked purity. "Why have this flat display if you're going to glom all this stuff on its back?" he asked. "We should let each element be true to itself." When Ive visited Jobs' house to talk over the issue, Jobs suggested basing the computer on sunflowers, which were growing in his garden. The suggestion of a narrative in the design appealed to Ive, who began sketching out designs drawing on the sunflower shape. (Note: This is the most commonly given origin for the iMac G4's shape, but Leander Kahney reports another origin offered by an unnamed former executive. In this telling, Ive made two designs: one with the computer behind the screen, and one with a separate screen and base. Jobs chose the latter "goose neck" design because its anthropomorphic features made it more approachable.)

The machine took two years to develop, and nineteen prototypes were developed before arriving at the final design. Ive and the design team first tried to attach the screen to the base with a series of vertebrae held together by spring-loaded cables. A clamp on the back of the screen applied tension to the cables and allowed the spine to loosen or stiffen. This design required two hands to grab the screen and release the clamp, and proved difficult for some users to adjust. It would also have required a convoluted assembly process and been extremely difficult to service. Ive solicited feedback from design consultancy firm IDEO, who recommended abandoning the spine idea in favor of a more practical design with two rigid arms. Designer Doug Satzger suggested that they did not need the amount of flexibility the two-arm design offered, and after Jobs concurred, the second arm was dropped. The final arm was made of stainless steel with an internal spring that balanced the screen while being free enough to be moved by the touch of a finger. The designers added the plastic halo ringing the screen that offered space for adjustment without touching the display, and minimized the look of a thick bezel around the edges. The computer components of the machine were put in the weighted base, which borrowed work done for the ill-fated Power Mac G4 Cube to cool the machine by using a fan to draw air from the bottom and expelling it out the top.

The iMac's final design suggested a sunflower or a desk lamp, and its anthropomorphic features made it, like its predecessor, feel more friendly and approachable. Jobs was so taken with the design that, in an uncommon move, he listed himself as the primary inventor on one of the design patents for the machine. Whereas the iMac G3 had been made of translucent plastics in a variety of colors, the new iMac was mostly opaque white, following from decisions Jobs had made to make the iPod music player all white. Ive called the color "pure and quiet", and Jobs felt the color made consumer products feel more premium, rather than disposable.

The iMac was to be fabricated in Taiwan, but Michael Hillman, the senior manager in product design overseeing the project, determined Taiwanese suppliers would not be capable of doing the job alone. Instead, vendors across multiple Asian countries were used. Because Apple was creating a computer unlike any before, their engineers looked to find the capabilities they needed beyond computer manufacturers; bicycle companies helped with the metal arm.

== Release ==
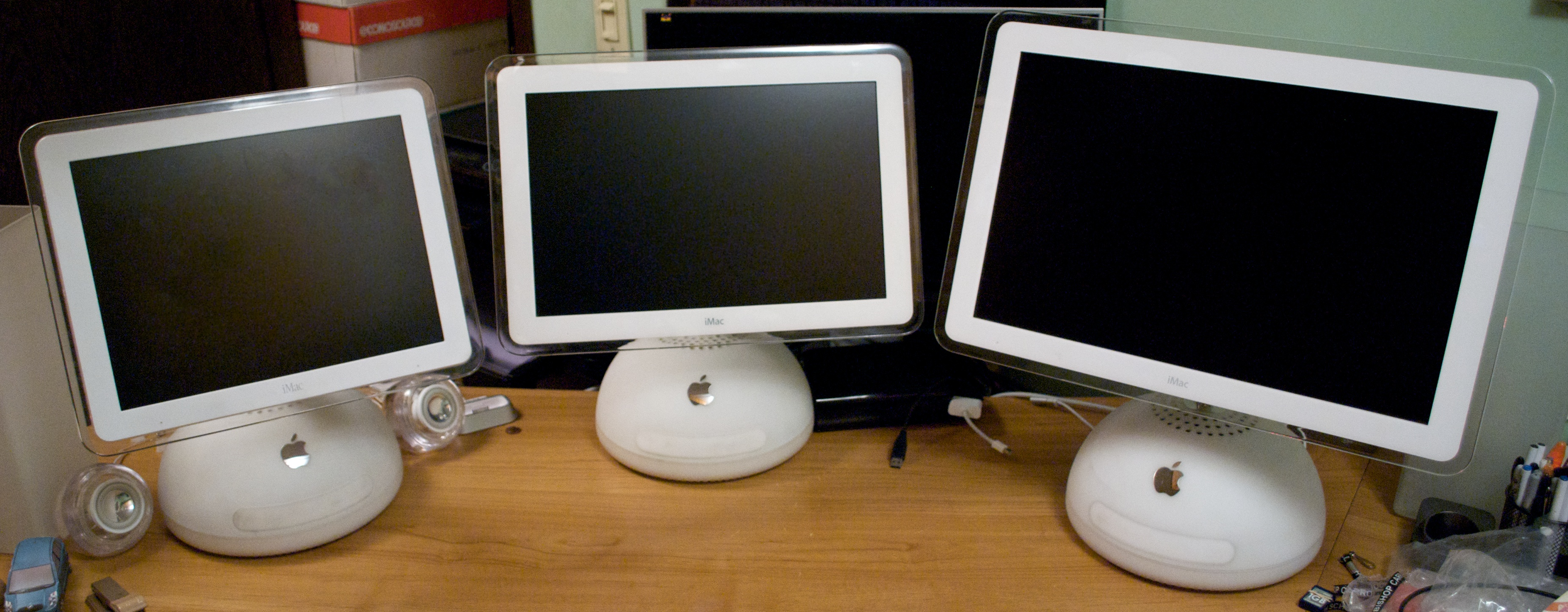
15-inch, 17-inch, and 20-inch versions of the iMac G4

The new iMac was unveiled at the Macworld San Francisco trade show on January 7, 2002. Rumors had predicted a flat-panel iMac since the previous summer, as pundits considered the machine due for a revamp amid declining sales. In the aftermath of the dot-com crash, Apple's market share had eroded to just above 4% in the United States, and less worldwide. Analysts had heightened expectations that the new iMac would be able to shore up Apple's market position. On stage, Jobs declared the machine "the best thing I think we've ever done [...] it has a rare beauty and grace that is going to last the next decade." Ive surreptitiously walked the show floor to gauge the public's reaction. The floating monitor and arm's anthropomorphism and sense of personality was highlighted in product videos and ads.

Apple positioned the computer as the center of its "digital hub" strategy, where the Mac connected multimedia peripherals like the iPod and organized and edited audio and video. Jobs argued that most consumers wanted a better computer than the ones commonly available, and that meant a Mac; the iMac and hub strategy were part of what he saw as a "third phase" of personal computing, where users used computers to produce creative media. (Note: According to Jobs, the first phase of computing was using computers for work and utility (word processing, spreadsheets, etc.) while the second phase was connecting computers via the internet.) The price of an iMac with the ability to burn DVDs was under US$2,000 ($3,580 in 2025), compared to the $3,500 it had cost two years earlier for the capability on a Power Mac.

Apple launched the iMac G4 in a staggered fashion due to supply constraints. (Note: Initially, the iMac G4 was supposed to be the top-end of the iMac line, while the lower-end models would have been revamped versions of the CRT models. Instead, the new design replaced the entire lineup, leading to a struggle for Apple's vendors to produce up to ten times as many units as previously planned.) Only the most-expensive 15-inch model was available in January 2002, followed by the cheaper configurations in February and March. Preorders of the iMac in its first week after announcement were the highest of any Apple product since the original. Apple said it received more than 150,000 preorders for the iMac in the first month, and produced more than 5,000 iMacs a day to meet the initial demand. Higher prices for RAM and LCDs caused the company to raise the price on iMac configurations by $100, though existing orders were honored at the original price. A high-end model with a larger display was released in August. This 17-inch iMac offered a widescreen 1440×900 pixel display, more hard drive capacity, better graphics, and was slightly heavier. The other iMacs dropped back to their original prices. Low-end versions of the previous G3 model continued to be sold until 2003 until they were replaced by the eMac. The most expensive configuration of the eMac was cheaper than the entry-level iMac G4.

The next revision to the iMac line came in February 2003; the previous configurations offered were reduced to a single 15- and 17-inch model each. Alongside lower prices, they featured faster processors, optical drives, and faster AirPort Extreme networking and RAM on the 17-inch model. The 17-inch model also added an audio-in jack, the ability to mirror the display to composite video devices via an adapter, and a Bluetooth expansion module for short-range wireless communication with peripherals.

In September 2003, the iMac line was revised again, with the 15- and 17-inch models receiving faster processors and graphics at the same prices, and faster USB 2.0 ports replacing the 1.1 versions. The 15-inch model also received the Bluetooth and AirPort Extreme networking support that had previously been exclusive to the larger model. A larger 20-inch monitor option was added in November, featuring the same specs as the 17-inch model. The 20-inch models were heavier and the arm stiffer to support the larger display, which made the monitors harder to manipulate and position.

== Reception ==
The iMac G4 was positively received, particularly the flat-screen design that allowed critics to forget the rest of the computer was there. The Washington Post's Rob Pegoraro called the design "staggeringly useful" and found the screen was never in the wrong place. USA Today's Edward Baig and others liked the desk lamp look, with many comparing it to the Luxo Jr. character that starred in a Pixar short animation. (Note: Apple denied a Luxo Jr. influence; coincidentally, Pixar creative chief John Lasseter also directed the initial iMac G4 advertisement.) Pegoraro and James Coates compared the computer's dome to the character R2-D2. (Note: Cited to:) Others found the iMac G4 ungainly, with The Wall Street Journal's Walter Mossberg and The Vancouver Sun's Peter Wilson left with the sense it was always likely to tip over. Popular Mechanics's Tobey Grumet found the iMac larger than the promotional shots suggested, and that overall it took up nearly as much space as the CRT model it replaced.

Reviewers cited the iMac's ease of use as a major positive of the machine, as well as the quality of its included software. The Irish Times's Karlin Lillington said the setup of the computer was so simple a child could do it, while Baig cited the "plug and play" nature of its hardware and software as the best feature of the computer. The large port selection was also praised, with The Baltimore Sun's David Zeiler saying they met the needs of home and education consumers who would not care about the computer's limited expansion options. PC Magazine and HWM were among the publications that suggested the machine would entice Windows PC users to switch to Macs, with the prices of comparably-specced iMacs and Windows PCs generally close. (Note: Cited to:) Joe Wilcox of betanews felt that the iMac and similar all-in-one systems were as expensive but less portable than midrange Windows laptop computers.

Critics noted the performance improvements of the G4 processor. Jason Snell of Macworld wrote that compared to the consumer iMac G3, the new iMac was fast enough for demanding users who did not need the expansion options of a Power Mac. Peter Wilson and The New York Times's David Pogue felt that the iMac was a better value than the lower-end Power Macs, and might steal sales away from the latter. In comparison, The Guardian's Neil McIntosh found the iMac powerful enough, but that the Power Macs were much speedier than the on-paper difference suggested. Macworld speed tests found that the iMac generally performed worse than equivalent G4 processors in the Power Mac line, while another comparison found that the iMac lagged behind a similarly priced Pentium 4 system in multitasking performance.

Other complaints about the iMac included the placement of the computer's ports and power button on the back of the base, since this made it harder to plug and unplug peripherals. (Note: Cited to:) Neil McIntosh called it the machine's "Achilles heel". Baig and PC Magazine's Troy Dreier found that the external speakers sounded tinny. Other deficiencies noted were the limited options for expansion, color-shifting of the screens when viewed at extreme angles, and the small amount of RAM offered on the entry-level models. Some reviews complained of hardware glitches and malfunctions. Dreier felt the keyboard and mouse were unappealing and likely to be immediately replaced by users, while Mossberg and ZDNet regretted the lack of a wireless option for the mouse and keyboard, which Apple would not offer until 2003.

== Legacy ==
Comparison of iMac models

Apple sold 1.3 million iMacs in 2002, making it their top-selling product for the year. iMac and eMac models sales during the iMac G4's lifespan totaled roughly 3.1 million units. (Note: Apple grouped all iMac (and later, iMac and eMac) sales together in a single iMac category on quarterly financial reports. Sales figures for the category were 372K Q2'02 (the first fiscal quarter the iMac G4 was sold,) 378K Q3'02, 318K Q4'02, 298K Q1'03, 256K Q2'03, 287K Q3'03, 253K Q4'03, 227K Q1'04, 217K Q2'04, 243K Q3'04, and 229K Q4'04.) The iMac G4 helped rehabilitate Apple's public image after the failure of the G4 Cube, and proved that Apple's success with the iMac G3 was not a fluke. Apple enthusiasts have called it one of the best computers Apple has made. The design won a gold International Design Excellence Award in 2002, and Apple won more awards that year than any other company. Ive won the Designer of the Year award from the Design Museum in 2003 for his work on the iMac and other products. iMac G4 models are held in the permanent collections of museums such as the Museum of Modern Art, HomeComputerMuseum, Museums Victoria, and Science Museum Group.

While Jobs had declared the iMac G4 would reshape the look of computers for the next decade, the iMac's ergonomic design language would not last three years. The balance of the machine was challenged by larger displays, and the G4 processor's successor, the G5, ran much hotter and needed more cooling. Macworld called the successor iMac G5 "conservative" compared to the G3 and G4 models, as it gave up the exuberant colors and sunflower design of previous iMacs in favor of placing the computer internals behind the display—the same approach Jobs had previously eschewed as inelegant. This design proved to be the template future iMac models would use. Apple's experience with the iMac G4 spurred it to consolidate more manufacturing in China. The iMac G4 has been adapted by hobbyists to use newer components, such as Apple's latest custom chips.

== Specifications ==
Model	Flat Panel			15-inch 800 MHz	17-inch 1 GHz	USB 2.0		
Release date	January 7, 2002		August 13, 2002	February 4, 2003		September 8, 2003		November 18, 2003
Display	15" Thin-film-transistor (TFT) LCD		17" TFT widescreen LCD	15" TFT LCD	17" TFT widescreen LCD	15" TFT LCD	17" TFT widescreen LCD	20" TFT widescreen LCD
Processor	700 MHz		800 MHz		1.0 GHz		1.25 GHz	
Cache	256 KB level 2 cache							
Front Side Bus	100 MHz				133 MHz	167 MHz		
Memory (Note: Two slots; one populated and one open user-accessible slot)	128 MB of PC133 SDRAM	256 MB of PC133 SDRAM	128 or 256 MB of PC133 SDRAM	256 MB of PC133 SDRAM	256 MB of PC2100 (266 MHz) DDR SDRAM	256 MB of PC2700 (333 MHz) DDR SDRAM		
Graphics	Nvidia GeForce 2 MX; 32 MB of DDR SDRAM		Nvidia GeForce 4 MX; 32 MB of DDR SDRAM	Nvidia GeForce 2 MX; 32 MB of DDR SDRAM	Nvidia GeForce 4 MX; 64 MB of DDR SDRAM	Nvidia GeForce 4 MX; 32 MB of DDR SDRAM	Nvidia GeForce FX 5200 Ultra; 64 MB of DDR SDRAM	
Hard drive	40 GB, 60 GB, 80 GB			60 GB, 80 GB		80 GB, 160 GB		
Optical drive	32× CD-R and 10× CD-RW write CD-RW Drive	8× DVD and 32× CD read Combo drive	6× DVD and 24× CD read; 2× DVD-R, 8× CD-R, and 4× CD-RW write SuperDrive	32× Combo drive	4× SuperDrive	32× Combo drive	4× SuperDrive	
Network	10BASE-T/100BASE-TX Ethernet; 56k V.90 modem Optional 11 Mbit/s AirPort 802.11b			10BASE-T/100BASE-TX Ethernet; 56k V.92 modem Optional 11 Mbit/s AirPort 802.11b	10BASE-T/100BASE-TX Ethernet; 56k V.92 modem Optional Bluetooth 1.1; Optional 54 Mbit/s AirPort Extreme 802.11b/g			
Peripherals	3× USB 1.1; 2× FireWire 400; Built-in microphone Audio out Apple Pro Speakers mini-jack					3× USB 2.0; 2× FireWire 400; Built-in microphone Audio out Apple Pro Speakers mini-jack		
Video out	Mini-VGA							
Original operating system	Mac OS 9 and Mac OS X 10.1			Mac OS X Jaguar 10.2		Mac OS X Panther 10.3		
Maximum operating system	Mac OS X Tiger 10.4 if 256 MB RAM installed, otherwise Mac OS X Panther 10.3				Mac OS X Leopard 10.5 if 512 MB RAM installed, otherwise Mac OS X Tiger 10.4			
Weight	21.2 lb. / 9.7 kg		22.8 lb. / 10.4 kg	21.2 lbs. / 9.7 kg	22.8 lbs. / 10.4 kg	21.2 lb. / 9.7 kg	22.8 lb. / 10.4 kg	40.1 lb. / 18.2 kg
