= All-in-one computer =

PC form factor with integral display

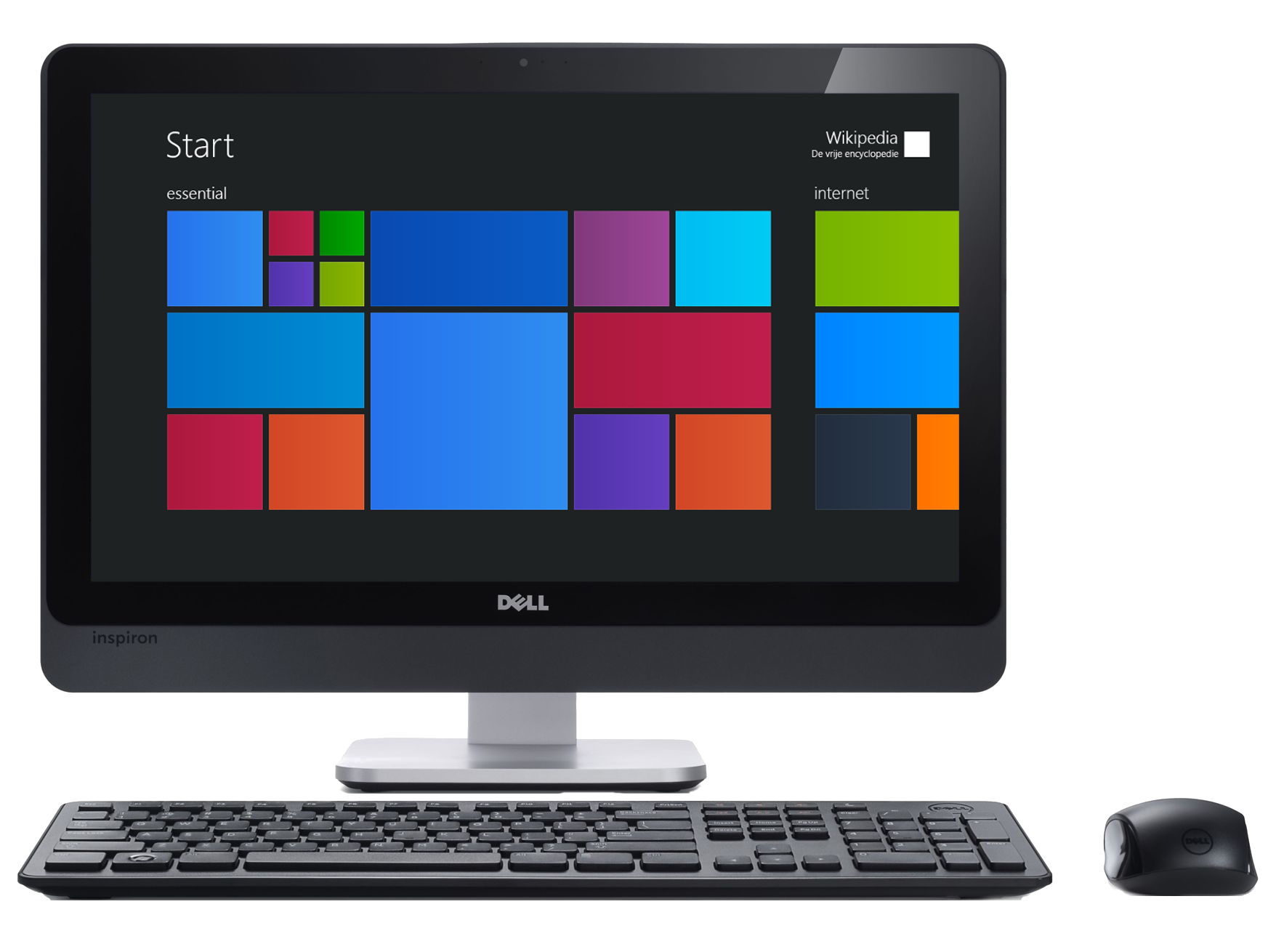
Dell Inspiron One 23 Touch, an all-in-one PC from 2012

An all-in-one computer (also called an AIO or all-in-one PC) is a type of personal computer that integrates the computer's main components, such as the CPU, monitor, and speakers, into a single unit. It occupies a smaller footprint than a desktop computer with a tower form factor, and also requires fewer external cables.

== Advantages and disadvantages ==
Some advantages of the all-in-one computer compared to other form factors include being easier to set up, a reduced physical footprint, ease of transportation, and the option to interface with the computer via touchscreen (a now-common fixture on all-in-ones). Some disadvantages include generally being more expensive than desktop computers, a lack of customizability—most of the internal hardware such as the RAM and the SSD, especially in post-late-2010s machines, is soldered onto the system board—a lack of upgrade paths for the CPU, RAM, and technology of the display, and the difficulty of repair. The slim design also allows for minimal airflow, which can make them prone to overheating. Having more powerful processors and graphic cards causes overheating which leads to inefficiencies.

== History ==
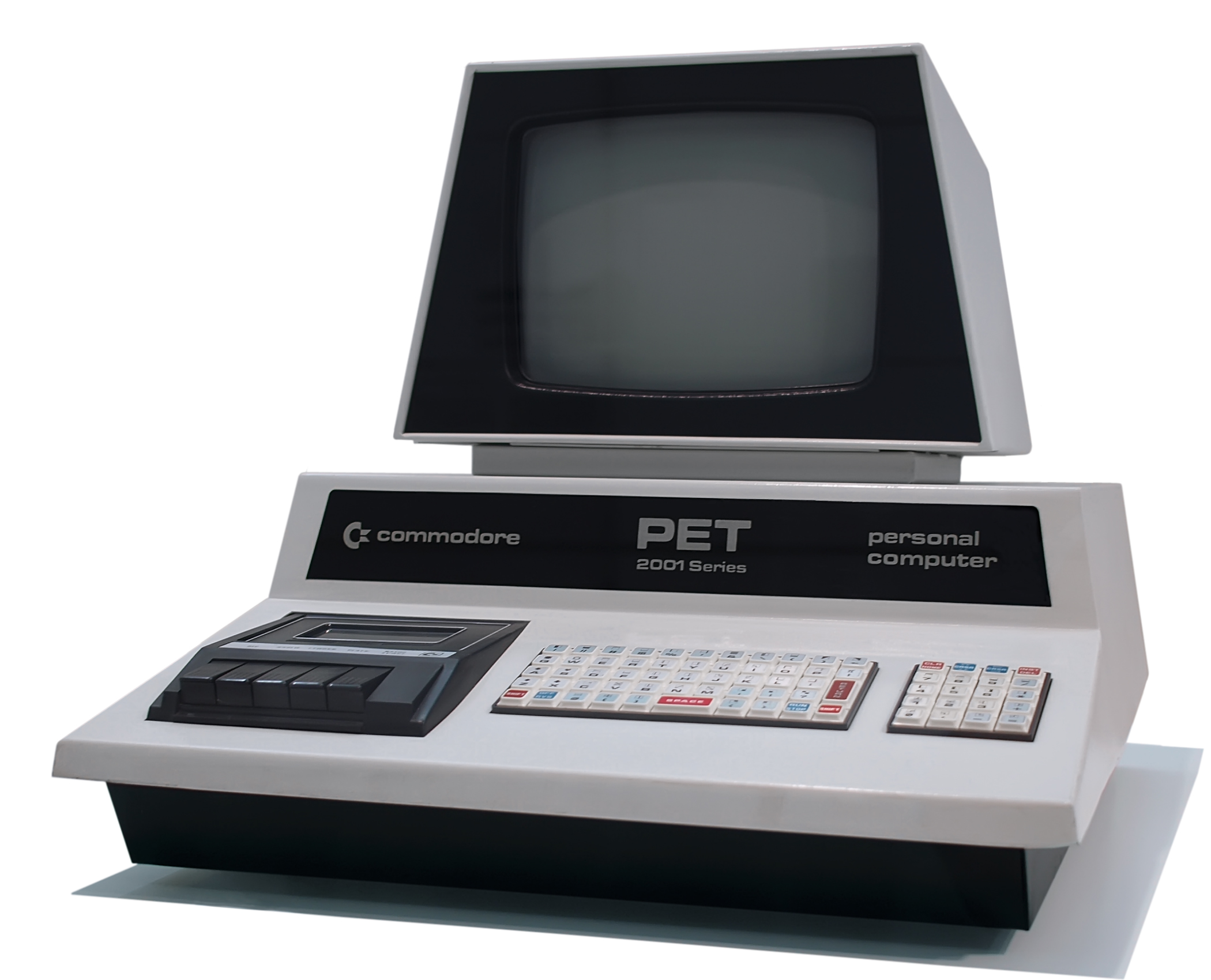
Commodore PET (2001 Series), an all-in-one computer from 1977

This form factor was popular during the early 1980s for personal computers intended for professional use such as the Commodore PET, the Osborne 1, the TRS-80 Model II, and the Datapoint 2200. Many manufacturers of home computers like Commodore and Atari included the computer's motherboard into the same enclosure as the keyboard; these systems were most often connected to a television set for display. Apple has manufactured several popular examples of all-in-one computers, such as the compact Macintoshes of the mid-1980s and early 1990s, the Macintosh LC 500 series in the mid-1990s, the eMac from 2002 to 2006, and the iMac series since 1998 to the present.

Since the early 2000s, some all-in-one desktops, such as the iMac G4, have used laptop components in order to reduce the size of the system case. By the mid 2000s, many all-in-one designs have used flat-panel displays (chiefly LCDs), and later models have incorporated touchscreen displays, allowing them to be used similarly to a mobile tablet.

Like most laptops, some all-in-one desktop computers are characterized by an inability to customize or upgrade internal components, as the systems' cases do not provide convenient access to upgradable components, and faults in certain aspects of the hardware may require the entire computer to be replaced, regardless of the health of its remaining components. There have been exceptions to this; the monitor portion of HP's Z1 workstation can be angled flat, and opened like a vehicle hood for access to internal hardware.

== See also ==
- 2-in-1 PC
- Internet appliance
- Laptop
- Portable computer
- Keyboard computer
- Desktop form factor
- Panel PC
- Carputer
