= List of applications of PowerPC =

Microprocessors belonging to the PowerPC/Power ISA (Note: PowerPC, as an evolving instruction set, has since 2006 been named Power ISA, while the old name lives on as a trademark for some implementations of Power Architecture-based processors) architecture family have been used in numerous applications.

== Personal computers ==
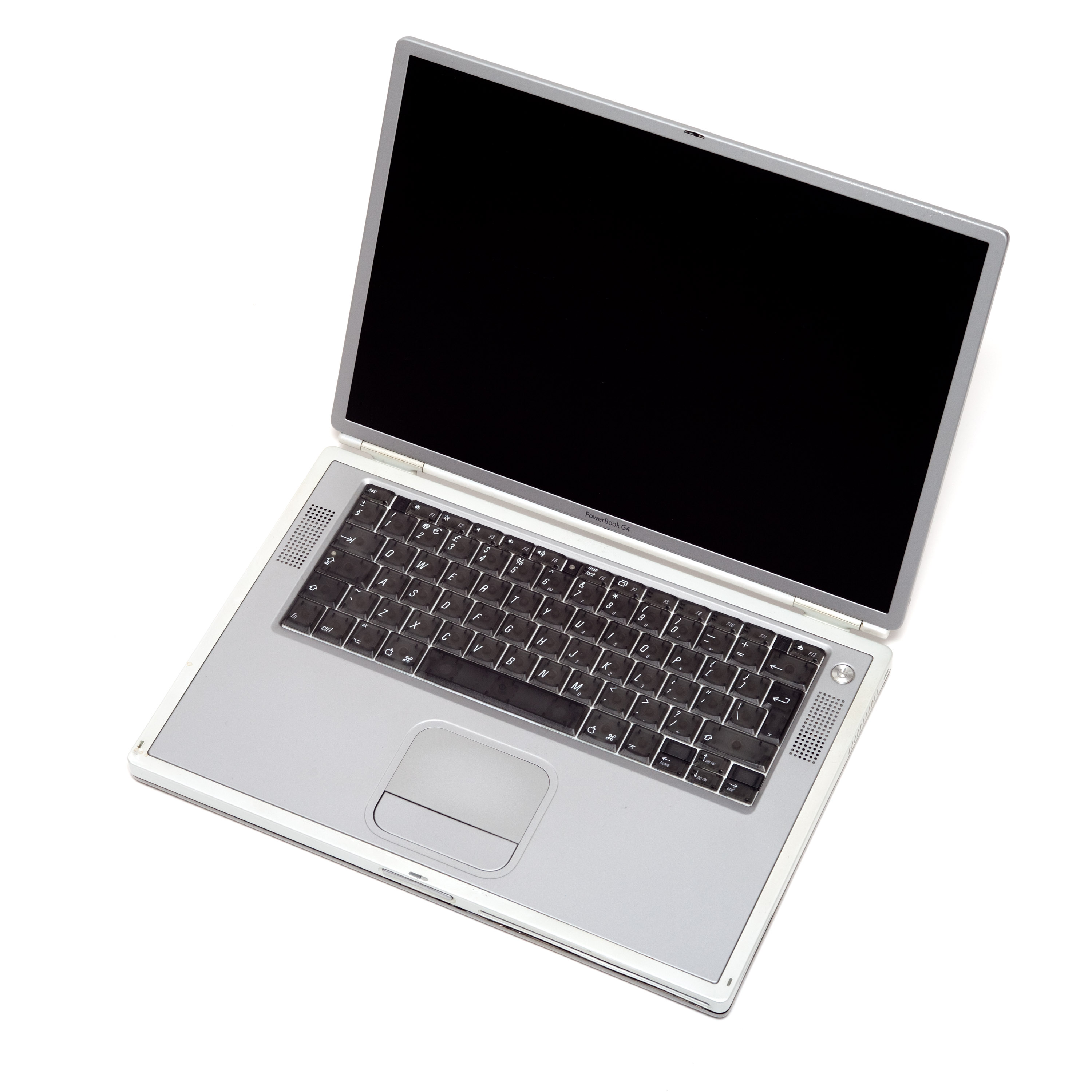
PowerBook G4

Apple Computer was the dominant player in the market of personal computers based on PowerPC processors until 2006 when it switched to Intel-based processors. Apple used PowerPC processors in the Power Mac, iMac, eMac, PowerBook, iBook, Mac mini, and Xserve. Classic Macintosh accelerator boards using PowerPCs were made by DayStar Digital, Newer Technology, Sonnet Technologies, and TotalImpact.

There have been several attempts to create PowerPC reference platforms for computers by IBM and others: The IBM PReP (PowerPC Reference Platform) is a system standard intended to ensure compatibility among PowerPC-based systems built by different companies; IBM POP (PowerPC Open Platform) is an open and free standard and design of PowerPC motherboards. Pegasos Open Desktop Workstation (ODW) is an open and free standard and design of PowerPC motherboards based on Marvell Discovery II (MV64361) chipset; PReP standard specifies the PCI bus, but will also support ISA, MicroChannel, and PCMCIA. PReP-compliant systems will be able to run OS/2, AIX, Solaris, Taligent, and Windows NT; and the CHRP (Common Hardware Reference Platform) is an open platform agreed on by Apple, IBM, and Motorola. All CHRP systems will be able to run Mac OS, OS/2-PPC, Windows NT, AIX, Solaris, Novell Netware. CHRP is a superset of PReP and the PowerMac platforms.

Power.org has defined the Power Architecture Platform Reference (PAPR) that provides the foundation for development of computers based on the Linux operating system.

List of computers based on PowerPC:

- Amiga accelerator boards:
  - Phase5 Blizzard PPC.
  - Phase5 CyberStorm PPC.
- Apple
  - iMac
  - PowerMac
  - Xserve
  - Mac mini
  - iBook
  - PowerBook
- Eyetech
  - AmigaOne
- Genesi
  - Pegasos Open Desktop Workstation (ODW).
  - EFIKA
- IBM
  - RS/6000 AIX workstations
- ACube Systems Srl
  - Sam440 (Samantha)
  - Sam460ex (Samantha)

== Servers ==
- Apple
  - Xserve Rack server.
- Genesi
  - Open Server Workstation (OSW) with dual IBM PowerPC 970MP CPU.
  - High density blade server (rack server).
- IBM
  - Rack server.

== Supercomputers ==
IBM

- Blue Gene/L and Blue Gene/P Supercomputer, keeping the top spots of supercomputers since 2004, also being the first systems to performa faster than one Petaflops.
- System p with POWER5 processors are used as the base for many supercomputers as they are made to scale well and have powerful CPUs.
- All supercomputers of Spanish Supercomputing Network, built using PowerPC 970 based blade servers. Magerit and MareNostrum are the most powerful supercomputers of the network.
- Roadrunner is a new Cell/Opteron based supercomputer that will be operational in 2008, pushing the 1 PetaFLOPS mark.
- Summit and Sierra, currently the world's first and second fastest supercomputers, respectively.

Apple

- System X of Virginia Tech is a supercomputer based on 1100 Xserves (PowerPC 970) running Mac OS X. First built using stock PowerMac G5s making it one of the cheapest and most powerful supercomputer in its day.

Cray

- The XT3, XT4 and XT5 supercomputers have Opteron CPUs but PowerPC 440 based SeaStar communications processors connecting the CPUs to a very high bandwidth communications grid.

Sony

- The PlayStation 3 is the base of Cell based supercomputer grids running Yellow Dog Linux.

== Personal digital assistants (smartphones and tablets) ==
IBM released a Personal Digital Assistant (PDA) reference platform ("Arctic") based on PowerPC 405LP (Low Power). This project is discontinued after IBM sold PowerPC 4XX design to AMCC.

== Game consoles ==
All three major seventh-generation game consoles contain PowerPC-based processors. Sony's PlayStation 3 console, released in November 2006, contains a Cell processor, including a 3.2 GHz PowerPC control processor and eight closely threaded DSP-like accelerator processors, seven active and one spare; Microsoft's Xbox 360 console, released in 2005, includes a 3.2 GHz custom IBM PowerPC chip with three symmetrical cores, each core SMP-capable at two threads, and Nintendo's Wii console, also released in November 2006, contains an extension of the PowerPC architecture found in their previous system, the GameCube.

Several arcade system boards were also powered by PowerPC-based processors, such as Sega Model 3, powering games such as Scud Race, Sega Rally 2 and Daytona USA 2, Konami Viper, which was used in Police 911 and Silent Scope EX, as well as Taito Type Zero, which powered the first two games in the Battle Gear series, as well as Densha de Go! 3. Because they are based on PowerPC-based console hardware, the Triforce, based on the GameCube, and Namco System 357, based on PlayStation 3, also use PowerPC-based processors.

== TV set-top boxes / digital recorder ==
IBM, Sony, and Zarlink Semiconductor had released several Set Top Box (STB) reference platforms based on IBM PowerPC 405 cores and IBM Set Top Box (STB) System-On-Chip (SOC)

- Sony set-top box (STB).
- Motorola set-top box.
- Dreambox set-top box.
- TiVo (Series1) personal TV/video digital recorder (VDR).

== Printers/graphics ==
- Global Graphics, YARC Raster Image Processing (RIP) system for professional printers.
- Hewlett-Packard, Kyocera, Konica-Minolta, Lexmark, Xerox laser and inkjet printers.

== Network/USB devices ==
- Buffalo Technology
  - Kuro Box/LinkStation/TeraStation network-attached storage devices
- Cisco routers
- Culturecom - VoIP in China.
- Realm Systems
  - BlackDog Plug-in USB mobile Linux Server

== Automotive ==
- Ford, Daimler Benz cars and other car manufacturers.

== Medical equipment ==
- Horatio - patient simulator for training doctor and nurse.
- Matrox image processing subsystem for medical equipment: MRI, CAT, PET, USG

== Military and aerospace ==
- The RAD750 (234A510, 234A511, 244A325) radiation-hardened processors, used in several spacecraft.
- Maxwell radiation hardened Single-board computer (SBC) for space and military projects.
- U.S. Navy submarine sonar systems.
- Canadarm for International Space Station (ISS) created by MacDonald, Detwiller & Associates (MDA).
- Leclerc main battle tank fire control

== Point of sales ==
- Culturecom - Tax Point of Sales terminal in China.

== Test and measurement equipment ==
- LeCroy digital oscilloscopes (certain series).
