= ODW =

ODW may refer to:

- Open Desktop Workstation, a PowerPC based computer by Genesi
- ODW, the IATA code for A.J. Eisenberg Airport, Washington, United States
