= Power Mac G4 =

Series of personal computers

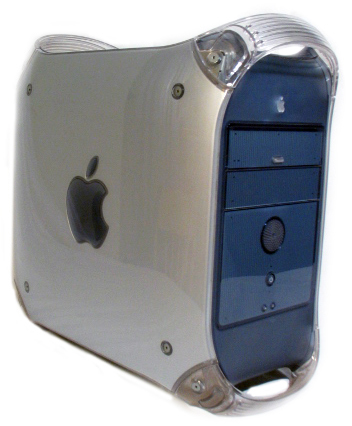
- The "Graphite" Power Mac G4
- Developer: Apple Computer
- Product family: Power Macintosh
- Type: Mini Tower
- Released: August 31, 1999
- Discontinued: June 9, 2004
- CPU: 1 or 2 × PowerPC G4 @ 350 MHz – 1.42 GHz
- Predecessor: Power Macintosh G3
- Successor: Power Mac G5
- Related: PowerBook
- Made in: USA, Ireland

The Power Mac G4 is a series of personal computers designed, manufactured, and sold by Apple Computer from 1999 to 2004 as part of the Power Macintosh line. Built around the PowerPC G4 series of microprocessors, the Power Mac G4 was marketed by Apple as the first "personal supercomputers", reaching speeds of 4 to 20 gigaFLOPS. This was the first existing Macintosh product to be officially shortened as "Mac" (with the exception of the iMac), and is the last Mac able to boot into classic Mac OS with the introduction of Mac OS X.

The enclosure style introduced with the Power Macintosh G3 (Blue and White) was retained through the entire five-year production run of the Power Mac G4, albeit with significant changes to match Apple's evolving industrial design and to accommodate increasing cooling needs. The G4 and its enclosure were retired with the introduction of the Power Mac G5.

== Overview ==
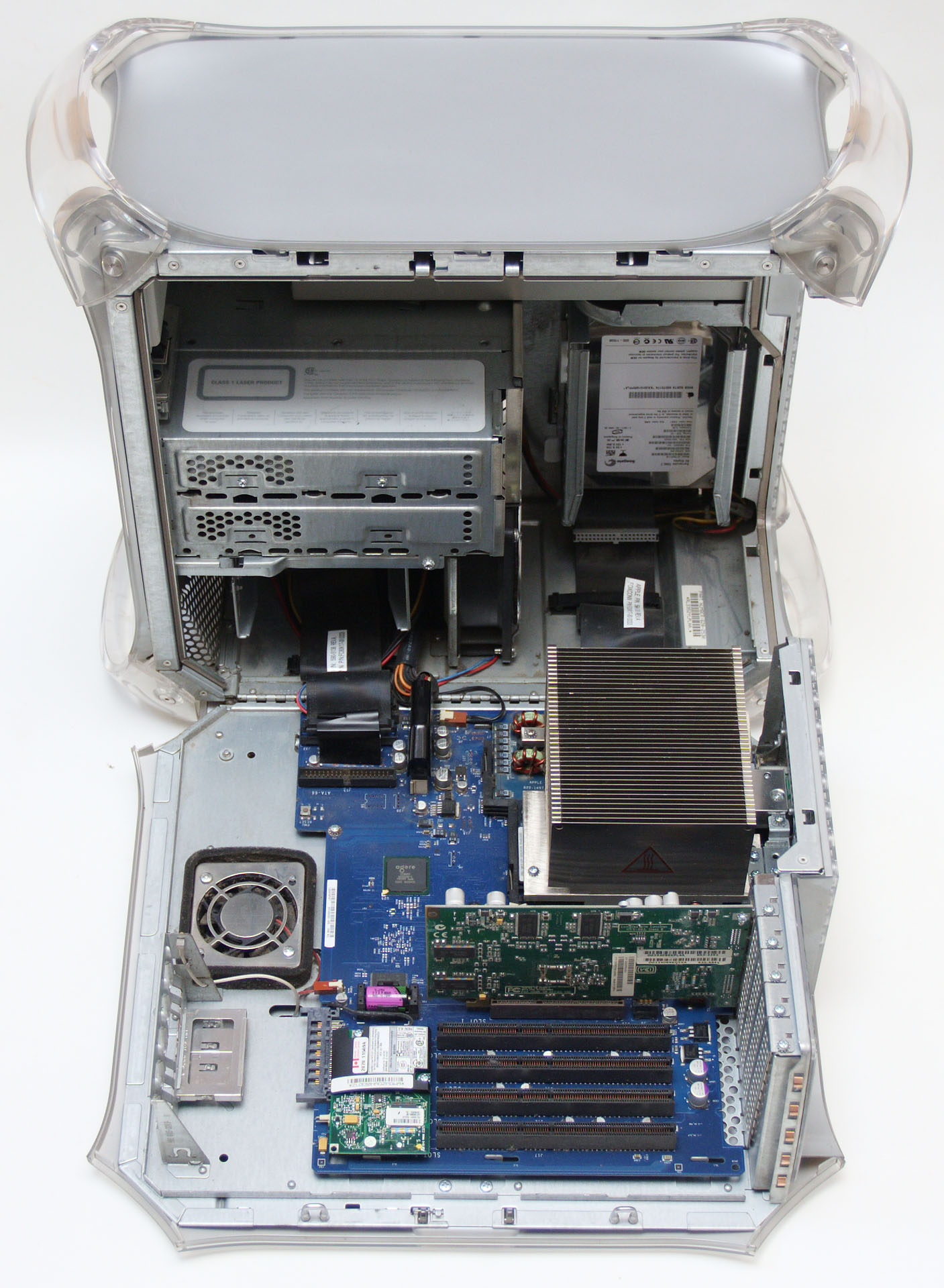
A Power Mac G4 with the case opened

The Power Mac G4 is a line of personal computers. The tower form factor case is adapted from that of the Power Macintosh G3 (Blue and White), and features a latch on the side which can be used to open the side of the machine for easy access to the internals.

The machine is designed around PowerPC G4 processors, which feature faster processor speeds, larger caches and cache speed boosts from their G3 predecessors. The Power Mac G4 used chips that included a subprocessor called the Velocity Engine that performs functions such as video decoding that would otherwise be formed by slower, separate chips. Software must be written to specifically address the Velocity Engine.

External connectivity is provided by Universal Serial Bus and FireWire ports. Early models have options for adding AirPort wireless networking via an expansion card; this later came standard.

== Development ==
After releasing the iMac, Apple adopted the translucent plastic computer's visual style to its line of professional desktop computers with the "Blue and White" PowerPC G3-powered Power Macintosh G3. These machines featured a colorful design with curved handles for portability and a motherboard mounted on the side of computer for ease of access. They also began a migration away from legacy connectivity, such as SCSI, floppy disk drives, and Apple Desktop Bus to Universal Serial Bus and FireWire. While it was not as popular as the iMac, the Power Macintosh G3 sold well and kept Apple's foothold in the more lucrative business market.

For the Power Mac G4, Apple kept the same design as the G3 it replaced, but came in a series of more sober case styling that presaged Apple's use of aluminum that would become Apple's trademark. The front panel switched from a blueberry color to gray (initially in a shade Apple called "graphite"), the formerly frosted white side panels became opaque silver, and the white handles became clear.

== Release ==
=== Graphite (1999-2001) ===
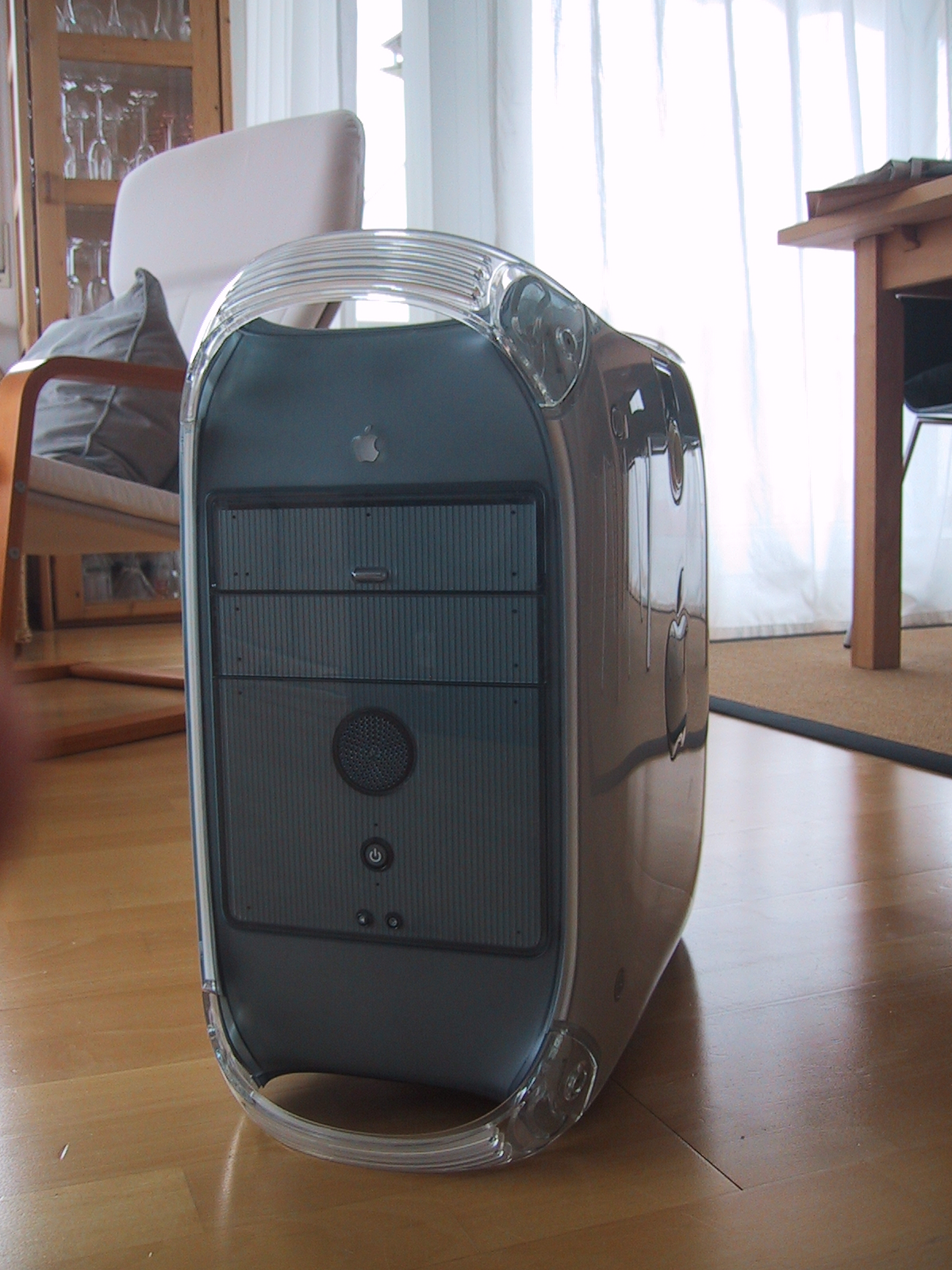
A "Graphite" Power Mac G4

The original Power Mac G4 was introduced at the Seybold conference in San Francisco on August 31, 1999. While marketed as a single, unified product line, there were two variants of the machine. The first, cheaper configuration, the Power Macintosh G4 (PCI Graphics), served as an intermediate step between the Power Mac G3s and the G4 processors, used a G4 processor on a modified version of the Blue-and-white G3's logic board, making them very similar to their predecessors. The higher-end configuration, Power Mac G4 (AGP Graphics), featured a new logic board and faster memory bandwidth, and swapped the PCI graphics-card slot for a faster Advanced Graphics Port slot.

Apple originally planned to ship the 500 MHz configuration in October 1999, but they were forced to postpone this because of poor yield of the CPUs. In response, Apple reduced the clock speed of the processor in each configuration by 50 MHz (making the options 350 MHz, 400 MHz and 450 MHz), which caused some controversy because they did not lower the original prices accordingly.

The early 400 MHz (later 350 MHz) PCI-based version used a motherboard identical to the one used in Power Macintosh G3 (Blue and White) computers including the use of Zero Insertion Force (ZIF) processors sockets (minus the ADB port), in a "graphite" colored case and with the new Motorola PowerPC 7400 (G4) CPU. The higher-speed models, code name "Sawtooth", used a greatly modified motherboard design with AGP 2x graphics (replacing the 66 MHz PCI slot).

The PCI variant was discontinued at the end of 1999.

The machines featured DVD-ROM drives as standard. The 400 and 450 MHz versions had 100 MB Zip drives as standard equipment, and as an option on the 350 MHz Sawtooth. This series had a 100 MHz system bus and four PC100 SDRAM slots for up to 2 GB of RAM (1.5 GB under Mac OS 9). The AGP Power Macs were the first to include an AirPort slot and DVI video port. The computers could house a total of three hard drives, two 128 GB ATA hard drives and up to a single 20 GB SCSI hard drive, with the installation of a SCSI card.

The 500 MHz version was reintroduced on February 16, 2000, accompanied by 400 and 450 MHz models. DVD-RAM and Zip drives featured on these later 450 MHz and 500 MHz versions and were an option on the 400 MHz.

The Power Mac G4 (Gigabit Ethernet) model was introduced at Macworld Expo New York on July 19, 2000; the new revision included dual-processor 450 MHz and 500 MHz versions, and a low-end single CPU 400 MHz model. It was also the first personal computer to include gigabit Ethernet as standard. Most people saw this revision as a stopgap release, because higher clocked G4s were not available; the G4's Motorola XPC107 "Grackle" PCI/Memory controller prevented the G4 from hitting speeds higher than 500 MHz. The dual 500 MHz models featured DVD-RAM optical drives. Zip drives were optional on all models. These models also introduced Apple's proprietary Apple Display Connector video port.

A new line with a revamped motherboard but retaining the familiar "Graphite" case debuted on January 9, 2001, known officially as the Power Mac G4 (Digital Audio). Motorola had added a seventh pipeline stage in the new PowerPC G4 design to achieve faster clock frequencies. New features included a fourth PCI slot, a 133 MHz system bus, an improved 4X AGP slot, and a new "digital audio" Tripath Class T amplifier sound system. The models were offered in 466 MHz, 533 MHz, dual 533 MHz, 667 MHz and 733 MHz configurations, the latter two using a newer PowerPC 7450 processor. The number of RAM slots was reduced to three, accommodating up to 1.5 Gigabytes of PC133 SDRAM.

The 733 MHz model was the first Macintosh to include a built-in DVD-R or Apple-branded SuperDrive, the rest of the line became the first Macs to ship with CD-RW drives.

=== Quicksilver (2001-2002) ===
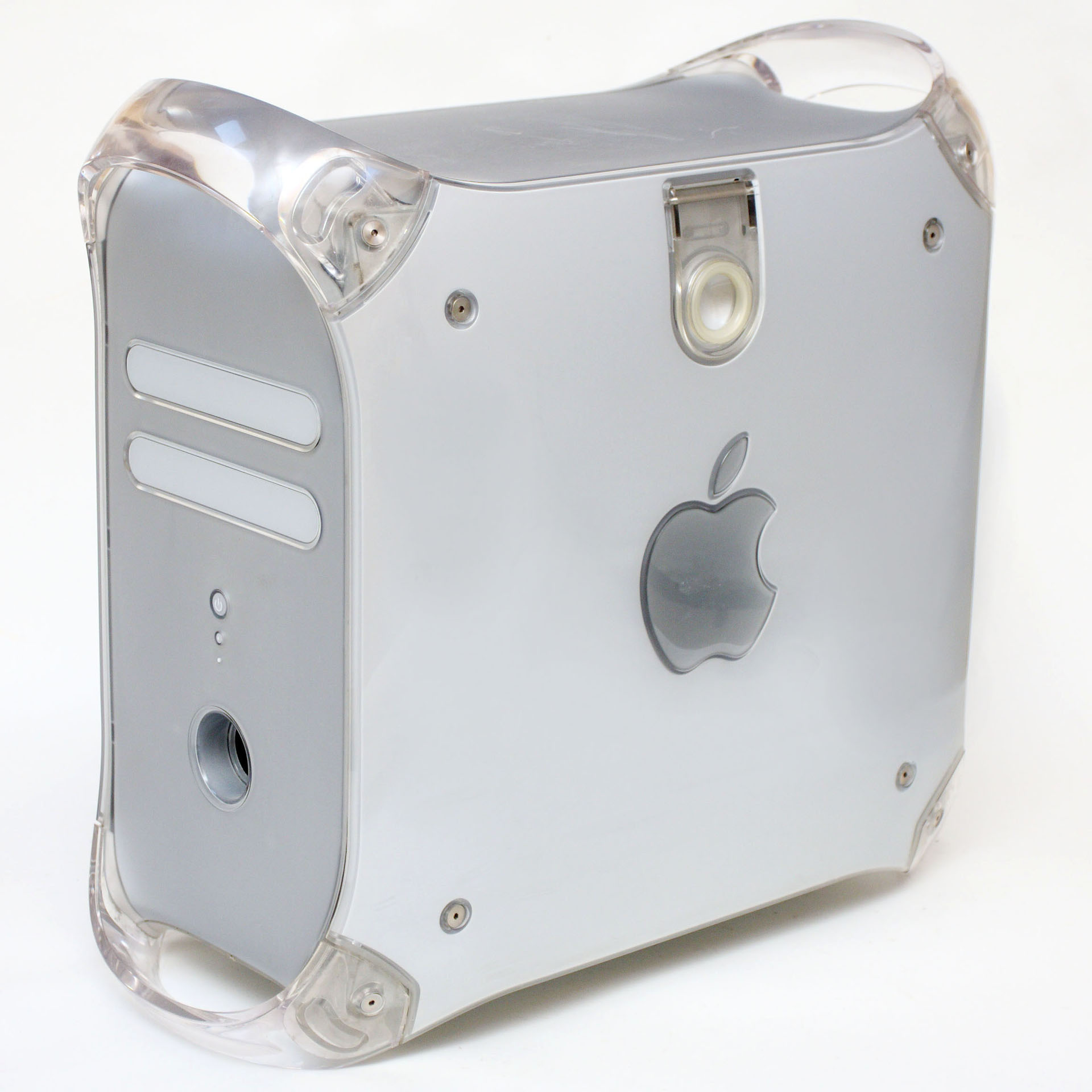
Power Mac G4 (Quicksilver)

At Macworld Expo New York on July 18, 2001, a new line debuted featuring a cosmetically redesigned case known as Quicksilver, and various upgrades to the specifications. It was available in 733, 867 and dual 800 MHz configurations. The 733 MHz model was notable for not having a level three cache. The SuperDrive was offered on the mid-range 867 MHz model, and UltraATA/100 hard drives were offered on all models. The internal speaker received an upgrade, using a Harman/Kardon speaker.

The Quicksilver line received criticism in MacWorld's review for removing the "eject" button and the manual eject pinhole, as well as the pass-through monitor power plug, and for the base specification of 128 MB RAM as being insufficient for running Mac OS X.

The Quicksilver case went through shifts in hardware features and design up until production was due to start, resulting in a mismatch between the color of the plastic on the machine's front doors and the rest of the case. Designer Doug Satzger recalled Steve Jobs was adamant that the issue be fixed before it shipped, despite pushback. Ive wanted special polished stainless steel screws in the handle of the case, which Jon Rubinstein vetoed as too expensive and delaying. Ive went around Rubenstein and got Jobs to approve the screws, though it created a widening rift between Ive and Rubinstein as Ive refused to compromise on his design vision.

Updated Quicksilver machines, officially named Power Mac G4 (Quicksilver 2002), were introduced on January 28, 2002, with 800 MHz, 933 MHz and dual 1 GHz configurations. This was the first Mac to reach 1 GHz. Again, the low-end 800 MHz model did not include any level three cache. The graphics in Updated Quicksilver machines were provided by an Nvidia GeForce4 Ti/MX or ATI Radeon 7500 graphics card. Some of these models have ATA controllers with 48-bit LBA to accommodate hard drives larger than 128 GB.

=== Mirrored Drive Doors (2002-2003) ===
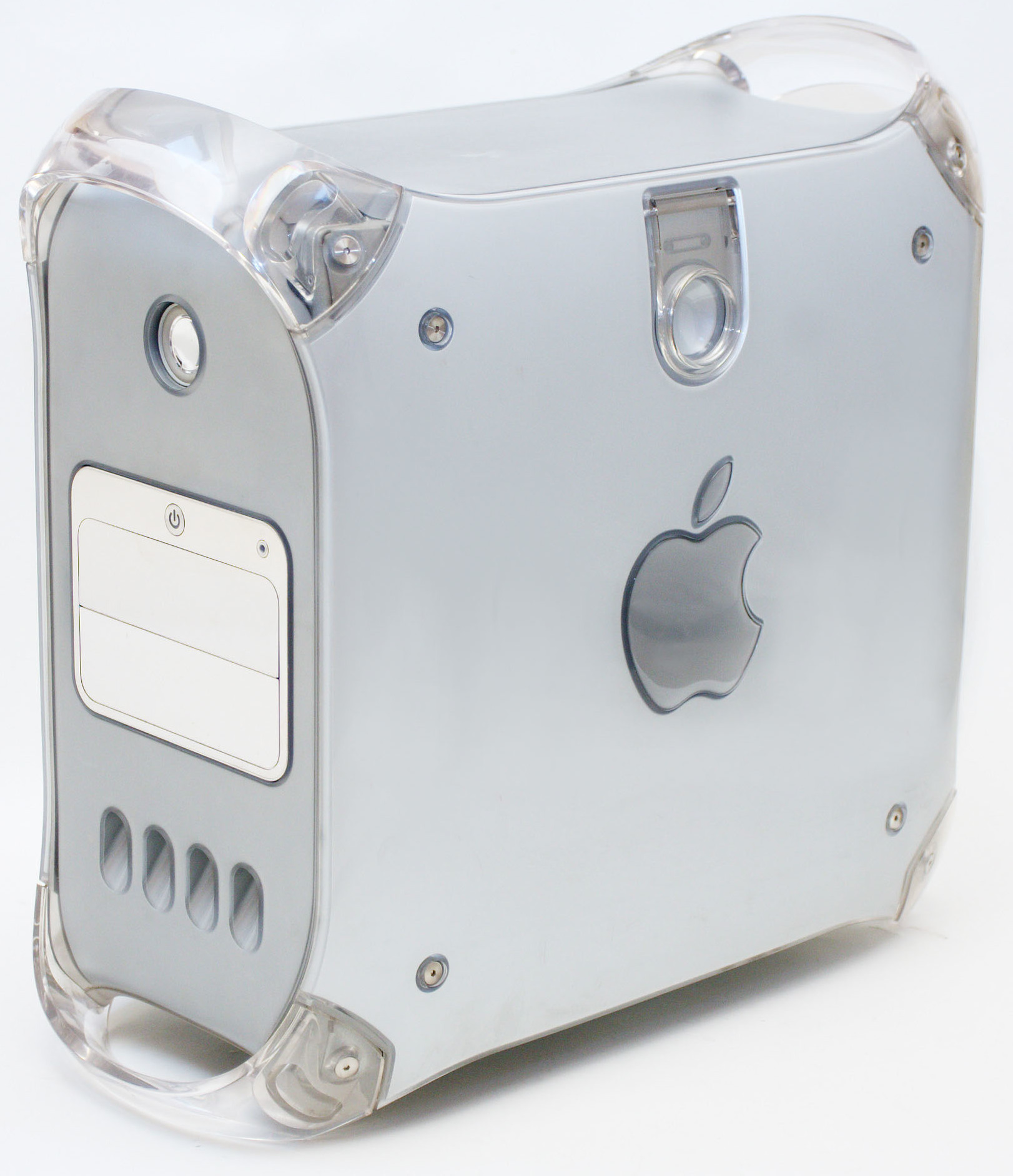
Power Mac G4 (Mirrored Drive Doors)

Another generation of Apple Power Mac G4s, officially named "Mirrored Drive Doors" (MDD), was introduced on August 13, 2002, featuring both a new Xserve-derived DDR motherboard architecture and a new case design. All models were available in dual processor configurations running at 867 MHz, 1 GHz or 1.25 GHz. As with the Xserves, the PowerPC 7455 CPU used does not have a DDR frontside bus, meaning the CPU of the 133 MHz frontside bus models could use at most only 50% of the new system's theoretical memory bandwidth, providing no improvement over previous models. The rest was available to the graphics card and I/O systems.

The early dual processor models generated more heat, and required more fans and larger heat sinks; the power supply fans were criticized for the increased noise, with third parties producing noise-reduction cases to dampen the sound in audio-sensitive environments. Apple released a firmware update to reduce fan noise and offered a fan and power supply exchange program.

The last real update to the Power Mac G4 line came on January 28, 2003, offering dual 1.42 GHz PowerPC 7455 processors, with features not seen in previous DDR models: a built-in FireWire 800 connector, optional integrated Bluetooth, and optional integrated AirPort Extreme. These were also the first Power Macs that could not boot into Mac OS 9.

With the launch of the Power Mac G5 on June 23, 2003, Apple re-introduced the August 2002 Power Mac G4 because of perceived demand for Mac OS 9 machines. Between that, its low price-tag, and the delayed availability of Power Mac G5s, it proved a strong seller, albeit for a relatively short time. Production stopped on June 9, 2004, and the remaining inventory was liquidated, its discontinuation ending the 20-year legacy of Classic Mac OS support.

== Technical specifications ==
=== Graphite models ===
Graphite variation		Late 1999 (PCI Graphics)		Late 1999 (AGP Graphics)					Mid 2000 (Gigabit Ethernet)			2001 (Digital Audio)			
Graphite variation	Codename	"Yikes!"		"Sawtooth", "P5", "Project E"					"Mystic", "Medusa2", "SnakeBite"			"Tangent", "Clockwork"			
Timeline	Introduced	August 31, 1999	October 13, 1999	August 31, 1999		October 13, 1999		December 2, 1999	July 19, 2000			January 9, 2001			
Timeline	Discontinued	October 13, 1999	December 2, 1999	July 19, 2000		February 16, 2000			January 9, 2001			July 18, 2001		March 8, 2001	July 18, 2001
Model	Model identifier	PowerMac1,2		PowerMac3,1					PowerMac3,3			PowerMac3,4			
Model	Model/EMC	M5183 (EMC 1832)	M5183 (EMC 1810/1843)	M5183 (EMC 1843)	M5183 (EMC 1810/1843)		M5183 (EMC 1843)		M5183 (EMC 1856)	M5183 (EMC 1864)		EMC 1862			
Model	Order number	M7631	M7826	M7232	M7629	M7824	M7825	M7827	M7891	M7892	M7893	M7627	M7688	M7945	M7681
Performance	Processor	PowerPC 7400								2 × PowerPC 7400		PowerPC 7410	1 or 2 × PowerPC 7410	PowerPC G4 7450	
Performance	Clock speed	400 MHz	350 MHz	450 MHz	500 MHz	400 MHz	450 MHz	350 MHz	400 MHz	450 MHz	500 MHz	466 MHz	533 MHz	667 MHz	733 MHz
Performance	CPU cache	64 KB L1, 1 MB backside L2 Cache per CPU (1:2)										64 KB L1; 256 KB (1:1) or 1 MB (1:2) L2; 1 MB L3 (733 MHz)			
Performance	Front side bus	100 MHz										133 MHz			
Performance	Memory Standard	64 MB PC100 SDRAM		128 or 256 MB PC100 SDRAM	256 MB PC100 SDRAM	64 or 128 MB PC100 SDRAM	256 MB PC100 SDRAM	64 MB PC100 SDRAM	64 MB PC100 SDRAM	128 MB PC100 SDRAM	256 MB PC100 SDRAM	128 MB PC133 SDRAM		256 MB PC133 SDRAM	
Performance	Memory Expandable	Up to 1 GB				Up to 2 GB; only 1.5 GB is seen in Mac OS 9									
Performance	Graphics card	ATI Rage 128; 16 MB of VRAM; 66 MHz PCI Slot		ATI Rage 128 or ATI Rage 128 Pro; 16 MB of VRAM; AGP 2x				ATI Rage 128 Pro; 16 MB of VRAM; AGP 2x	ATI Rage 128 Pro; 16 MB of VRAM; AGP 2x			ATI Rage 128 Pro with 16 MB VRAM; ATI Radeon or Nvidia GeForce2 MX with 32 MB VRAM; Nvidia GeForce3 with 64 MB VRAM			
Storage	Hard drive	10 GB; 5400 rpm		20 or 27 GB; 7200 rpm	27 GB; 7200 rpm	10 or 20 GB; 7200 rpm	27 GB; 7200 rpm	10 GB; 7200 rpm	20 GB; 5400 rpm	30 GB; 7200 rpm	40 GB; 7200 rpm	30 GB 5400 rpm, 40 or 60 GB 7200 rpm			
Storage	Hard drive	Ultra ATA/33 (Optional Ultra2 LVD SCSI)		Ultra ATA/66 (Optional Ultra2 LVD SCSI)								Ultra ATA/66 (Optional Ultra SCSI or Ultra 160 SCSI)			
Storage	Optical drive	32× CD-ROM		5× DVD-ROM	5× DVD-RAM	5× DVD-ROM	5× DVD-RAM	5× DVD-ROM				CD-RW or DVD-ROM			DVD-R/CD-RW SuperDrive
Connectivity	Networking	10/100 BASE-T Ethernet; 56k modem		10/100 BASE-T Ethernet; 56k modem Optional AirPort 802.11b					Gigabit Ethernet; 56k V.90 modem Optional AirPort 802.11b			Optional AirPort 802.11b Gigabit Ethernet; 56k V.90 modem			
Connectivity	Expansion	Optional Zip drive 3x 64bit 33 MHz PCI slots 1× 66 MHz PCI slot (dedicated to video)		Optional Zip drive 3x 64-bit 33 MHz PCI slots 1× 2× AGP slot (dedicated to video)								1x Zip Drive bay (Optional 250 MB Zip Drive); 4x 64-bit 33 MHz PCI slots 1x 4x AGP slot (dedicated to video)			
Connectivity	Peripherals	2× USB 1.1; 2× FireWire 400; Built-in mono speaker Audio input mini-jack Audio output mini-jack		2× USB 1.1; 2× FireWire 400; 1× Internal FireWire 400; Built-in mono speaker Audio input mini-jack Audio output mini-jack					2× USB 1.1; 2× FireWire 400; Built-in mono speaker Audio input mini-jack Audio output mini-jack			2x USB 1.1; 2x FireWire 400; Built-in mono speaker Audio output mini-jack Apple Pro Speakers mini-jack			
Operating System	Minimum	Mac OS 8.6							Mac OS 9.0.4			Mac OS 9.1			
Operating System	Maximum	All: Mac OS X 10.4.11 "Tiger" and Mac OS 9.2.2; Unofficially can support 10.5.8 Leopard via 3rd party software													
Dimensions		17 in (43.2 cm) height x 8.9 in (22.6 cm) width x 18.4 in (46.7 cm) depth													
Weight		28.7 lb (13 kg)		30 lb (13.6 kg)											

=== QuickSilver models ===
		Mid 2001 (QuickSilver)			Early 2002 (QuickSilver 2002)			Mid 2002 (QuickSilver 2002 ED)
Timeline	Introduced	July 18, 2001			January 28, 2002			August 13, 2002
Timeline	Discontinued	January 28, 2002			August 13, 2002			January 2003
Model	Codename	"Titan, Nichrome"			—N/a			—N/a
Model	Order number	M8359	M8360	M8361	M8705	M8666	M8667	[data missing]
Model	Model identifier	PowerMac3,5						
Model	EMC	1896						
Performance	Processor	PowerPC 7450		2 × PowerPC 7450	PowerPC 7451/7455		2 × PowerPC 7455	PowerPC 7455
Performance	Clock speed	733 MHz	867 MHz	800 MHz	800 MHz	933 MHz	1.0 GHz	867 MHz
Performance	CPU cache	64 KB L1; 256 KB (1:1) L2	64 KB L1; 256 KB (1:1) L2; 2 MB L3		64 KB L1; 256 KB (1:1) L2	64 KB L1; 256 KB (1:1) L2; 2 MB DDR L3		64 KB L1; 256 KB (1:1) L2
Performance	Front side bus	133 MHz						
Performance	Memory	128 MB PC133 SDRAM; Expandable to 1.5 GB		256 MB PC133 SDRAM; Expandable to 1.5 GB	256, or 512 MB PC133 SDRAM; Expandable to 1.5 GB			
Performance	Graphics	Nvidia GeForce2 MX with 32 MB VRAM; Nvidia Geforce2 MX with TwinView or Geforce3 with 64 MB VRAM			ATI Radeon 7500 with 32 MB VRAM; Nvidia GeForce4 MX with 64 MB VRAM or GeForce4 Ti with 128 MB VRAM			Nvidia GeForce4 MX with 32 MB VRAM
Storage	Hard drive	40 GB 5400-rpm, 60 or 80 GB 7200-rpm ATA; 36 or 72 GB SCSI; Up to 128 GB			40, 60, or 80 GB 7200-rpm ATA; 36 or 72 GB SCSI; Supports Hard Drives larger than 128 GB			40 GB 7200-rpm Supports Hard Drives larger than 128 GB
Storage	Hard drive	Ultra ATA/66 (Optional Ultra SCSI or Ultra 160 SCSI)						
Storage	Optical drive	CD-RW or CD-RW/DVD-ROM Combo Drive or DVD-R/CD-RW SuperDrive (867 and dual-800 models only)						CD-RW
Connectivity	Networking	Optional AirPort 802.11b Gigabit Ethernet; 56k V.90 modem						
Connectivity	Expansion	1x Zip Drive bay (Optional 250 MB Zip Drive); 4x 64-bit 33 MHz PCI slots 1x 4x AGP slot (dedicated to video)						
Connectivity	Peripherals	2x USB 1.1; 2x FireWire 400; Built-in mono speaker Audio output mini-jack Apple Pro Speakers mini-jack						
Operating System	Minimum	Mac OS 9.2 and Mac OS X 10.0			Mac OS X 10.1 and Mac OS 9.2.2			Mac OS X 10.2 "Jaguar" and Mac OS 9.2.2
Operating System	Maximum	Mac OS X 10.4.11 "Tiger" and Mac OS 9.2.2; Unofficially can support 10.5.8 Leopard via 3rd party software	Mac OS X 10.5.8 "Leopard" and Mac OS 9.2.2	Mac OS X 10.4.11 "Tiger" and Mac OS 9.2.2; Unofficially can support 10.5.8 Leopard via 3rd party software		Mac OS X 10.5.8 "Leopard" and Mac OS 9.2.2		
Dimensions and weight		17 in (43.2 cm) height x 8.9 in (22.6 cm) width x 18.4 in (46.7 cm) depth 30 lb (13.6 kg)						

=== Mirrored Drive Doors models ===
		Mid 2002 (Mirrored Drive Doors)			Early 2003 (FW 800)			Mid 2003	
Timeline	Introduced	August 13, 2002			January 28, 2003			June 23, 2003	
Timeline	Discontinued	January 28, 2003			June 23, 2003			June 9, 2004	
Model	Codename	"P57"			"P58"			"P59"	
Model	Model identifier	PowerMac3,6							
Model	Model/EMC number	M8570 (EMC 1914)							M8570 (EMC 1914C)
Model	Order Number	M8787	M8689	M8573	M8839	M8840	M8841	M9309	M9145 (a re-released version of M8573)
Performance	Processor	2 × PowerPC 7455			PowerPC 7455	2 × PowerPC 7455		PowerPC 7455	2 × PowerPC 7455
Performance	Clock speed	867 MHz	1 GHz	1.25 GHz	1 GHz	1.25 GHz	1.42 GHz	1.25 GHz	1.25 GHz
Performance	CPU cache	64 KB L1, 256 KB L2, 1 MB or 2 MB DDR L3							
Performance	Front side bus	133 MHz	167 MHz		133 MHz	167 MHz			
Performance	Memory	256 MB PC-2100 (266 MHz) DDR SDRAM	256 MB PC-2700 (333 MHz) DDR SDRAM	512 MB PC-2700 (333 MHz) DDR SDRAM	256 MB PC-2100 (266 MHz) DDR SDRAM	256 MB PC-2700 (333 MHz) DDR SDRAM	512 MB PC-2700 (333 MHz) DDR SDRAM	256 or 512 MB PC-2700 DDR SDRAM	
Performance	Memory	Expandable to 2 GB (4 x 512 MB PC-3200 DDR SDRAM)							
Performance	Graphics Card	Nvidia GeForce4 MX with 32 MB VRAM, ATI Radeon 9000 Pro with 64 MB VRAM, or GeForce4 Ti with 128 MB VRAM			Nvidia GeForce4 MX with 64 MB VRAM	ATI Radeon 9000 Pro with 128 MB VRAM		ATI Radeon 9000 Pro with 64 MB VRAM or Nvidia GeForce4 Ti 128 MB	
Performance	Graphics Card	Upgradeable to Nvidia GeForce 7800 GS with 256 MB VRAM (last GPU supported)							
Storage	Hard drive	60 GB 7200 rpm ATA/100 (Optional Ultra SCSI or Ultra 160 SCSI)	80 GB 7200 rpm ATA/100 (Optional Ultra SCSI or Ultra 160 SCSI)	120 GB 7200 rpm ATA/100 (Optional Ultra SCSI or Ultra 160 SCSI)	60 GB 7200 rpm ATA/100 (Optional Ultra SCSI or Ultra 160 SCSI)	80 GB 7200 rpm ATA/100 (Optional Ultra SCSI or Ultra 160 SCSI)	120 GB 7200 rpm ATA/100 (Optional Ultra SCSI or Ultra 160 SCSI)	80 or 160 GB 7200 rpm ATA; Ultra ATA/133 (2) and Ultra ATA/66 (2)	
Storage	Optical drive	CD-RW/DVD-ROM Combo Drive	DVD-R/CD-RW SuperDrive		CD-RW/DVD-ROM Combo Drive		DVD-R/CD-RW SuperDrive	CD-RW/DVD-ROM Combo Drive or DVD-R/CD-RW SuperDrive (Optional additional Combo Drive)	
Connectivity	Networking	Optional AirPort 802.11b Gigabit Ethernet; 56k V.92 modem			Optional AirPort Extreme 802.11b/g Gigabit Ethernet; 56k V.92 modem Optional Bluetooth 1.1			Optional AirPort 802.11b Gigabit Ethernet; 56k V.92 modem	
Connectivity	Peripherals	2x USB 1.1; 2x FireWire 400; Built-in mono speaker Audio input mini-jack Audio output mini-jack Apple Pro Speakers mini-jack			2x USB 1.1; 2x FireWire 400; 1x FireWire 800; Built-in mono speaker Audio input mini-jack Audio output mini-jack Apple Pro Speakers mini-jack			2x USB 1.1; 2x FireWire 400; Built-in mono speaker Audio input mini-jack Audio output mini-jack Apple Pro Speakers mini-jack	
Connectivity	Expansion	Four 64-bit 66 MHz PCI slots (5V only); One 4x 133 MHz AGP slot (dedicated to video)							
Operating System	Minimum	Mac OS X 10.2 "Jaguar"							
Operating System	Maximum	Mac OS X 10.5.8 "Leopard" if at least 512 MB RAM installed, otherwise Mac OS X 10.4.11 "Tiger"			Mac OS X 10.5.8 "Leopard"				
Operating System	Classic support	Mac OS 9.2.2 supported natively and Mac OS 9.1 or higher in the Classic Environment			Mac OS 9.1 or higher supported solely in the Classic Environment			Mac OS 9.2.2 supported natively and Mac OS 9.1 or higher in the Classic Environment (final model to support Classic Mac OS natively)	
Dimensions and weight		17 in (43.2 cm) height x 8.9 in (22.6 cm) width x 18.4 in (46.7 cm) depth 42 lb (19.1 kg)							

== Supported operating systems ==
Supported macOS releases
OS release	Graphite			Digital Audio/QuickSilver			Mirrored Drive Doors		
OS release	Late 1999 (PCI)	Late 1999 (AGP)	Mid 2000	Early 2001	Mid 2001	Early 2002	Mid 2002	Early 2003	Mid 2003
Mac OS 8	8.6	8.6	—N/a	—N/a	—N/a	—N/a	—N/a	—N/a	—N/a
Mac OS 9	Yes	Yes	9.0.4	9.1	9.2	9.2.2	9.2.2	Emulation only	9.2.2
10.0 Cheetah	Yes	Yes	Yes	Yes	10.0.4	—N/a	—N/a	—N/a	—N/a
10.1 Puma	Yes	Yes	Yes	Yes	Yes	10.1.2	—N/a	—N/a	—N/a
10.2 Jaguar	Yes	Yes	Yes	Yes	Yes	Yes	Yes	Yes	Yes
10.3 Panther	Yes	Yes	Yes	Yes	Yes	Yes	Yes	Yes	Yes
10.4 Tiger	Yes	Yes	Yes	Yes	Yes	Yes	Yes	Yes	Yes
10.5 Leopard (Note: Mac OS X Leopard is the final release to support PowerPC Macs.)	No	No	No	No	No	With 1 GB RAM	With 1 GB RAM	Yes	Yes

== Timeline ==
Timeline of Power Macintosh models
See also: List of Mac models

== See also ==
- Power Mac G4 Cube
