= Power Mac G4 Cube =

Personal computer produced by Apple Inc. from 2000 to 2001

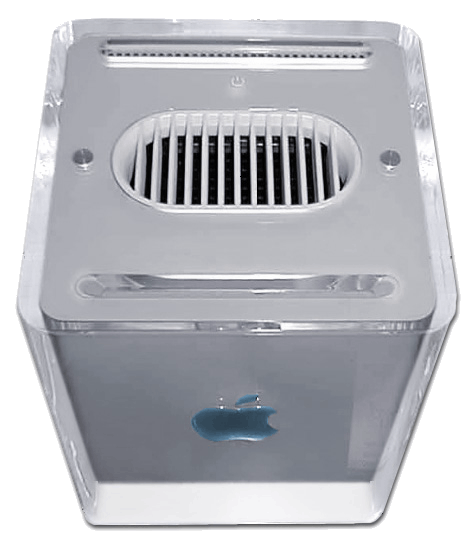
- A Power Mac G4 Cube, viewed from above
- Developer: Apple Computer, Inc.
- Product family: Power Macintosh
- Released: July 19, 2000
- Discontinued: July 3, 2001
- Operating system: Mac OS 9 · Mac OS X
- Dimensions: Height: 9.8 inches (25 cm); Width: 7.7 inches (20 cm); Depth: 7.7 inches (20 cm)
- Weight: 14 lb (6.4 kg)

The Power Mac G4 Cube is a Mac personal computer sold by Apple Computer, Inc. between July 2000 and 2001. The Cube was conceived as a miniaturized but powerful computer by Apple chief executive officer (CEO) Steve Jobs and designed by Jony Ive. Apple developed new technologies and manufacturing methods for the product—a 7.7-inch (20 cm) cubic computer housed in clear polycarbonate. Apple positioned it in the middle of its product range, between the consumer iMac G3 and the professional Power Mac G4. The Cube was announced at the Macworld Expo on July 19, 2000.

The Cube won awards and plaudits for its design upon release, but reviews noted its high cost compared to its power, its limited expandability, and cosmetic defects. The product was an immediate commercial failure, with only 150,000 units sold before production was suspended within one year of its announcement. The Cube is one of the rare failures for the company under Jobs, after having avoided bankruptcy. However, it influenced future Apple products, from the iPod to the Mac Mini. The Museum of Modern Art and other museums hold Cubes in their collections.

== Overview ==
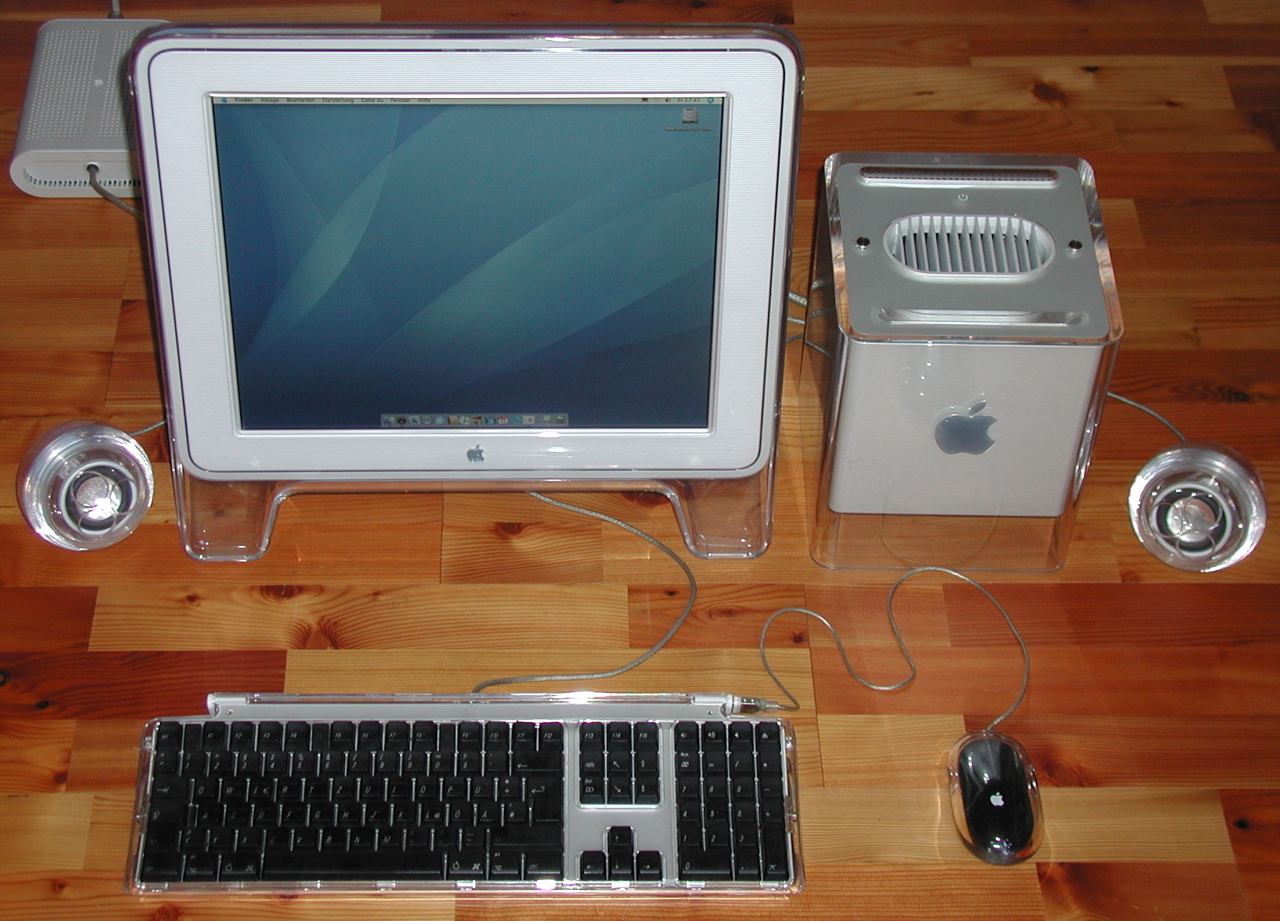
The Power Mac G4 Cube with power supply and peripherals were announced in tandem.

The Power Mac G4 Cube is a small cubic computer, suspended in a 7.7×7.7×9.8 in (20×20×25 cm) polycarbonate enclosure. The transparent plastic is intended to give the impression that the computer is floating. The enclosure houses the computer's vital functions, including a slot-loading optical disc drive. The Cube requires a separate monitor with either an Apple Display Connector (ADC) or a Video Graphics Array (VGA) connection. The machine has no fan to move air and heat through the case. Instead, it is passively cooled, with heat dissipated via a grille at the top of the case. The base model shipped with a 450 MHz PowerPC G4 processor, 64 MB of random-access memory (RAM), 20 GB hard drive, and an ATI Rage 128 Pro video card. A higher-end model with a 500 MHz processor, double the RAM, and a 30 GB hard drive was sold only through Apple's online store.

The Cube's small size does not feature expansion slots; it has a video card in a standard Accelerated Graphics Port (AGP) slot, but cannot fit a full-length card. The power supply is located externally to save space, and the Cube features no audio jacks. Instead, the Cube shipped with round Harman Kardon speakers and digital amplifier, attached via Universal Serial Bus (USB). Despite its size, the Cube fits three RAM slots, two FireWire 400 ports, and two USB 1.1 ports for connecting peripherals in its frame. These ports and the power cable are located on the underside of the machine. Access to the machine's internal components is accomplished by inverting the unit and using a pop-out handle to slide the entire internal assembly out from the shell.

== Development ==
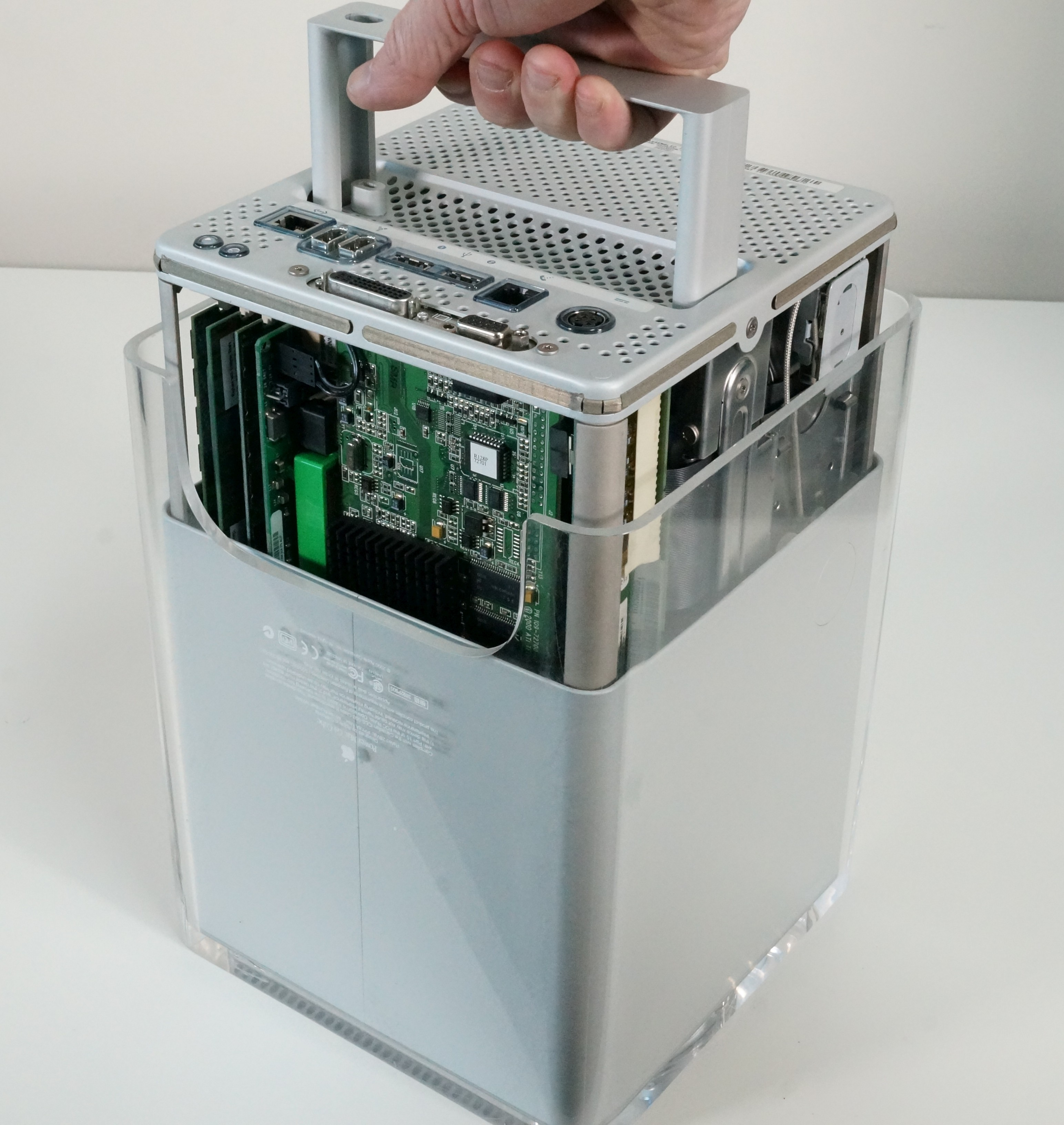
Access to the computer's internal components is gained by using a handle to pull the computer out of its plastic shell.

The Cube was an important product to Apple, and especially to Apple CEO Steve Jobs, who said the idea for the product came from his own desires as a computer user for something between the iMac and Power Mac G4, saying, "I wanted the [flat-panel] Cinema Display but I don't need the features of the Power Mac". Jobs's minimalist aesthetic influenced the core components of the design, from the lack of a mechanical power button, to the trayless optical drive and quiet fanless operation. The design team at Apple, led by Jonathan Ive, shrunk a powerful desktop form factor, seeing traditional desktop tower computers as lazily designed around what was easiest for engineers. The Cube represented an internal shift in Apple, as the designers held increasing sway over product design. The New York Times called the Cube "pure [...] industrial design" harkening to Bauhaus concepts.

The Cube represented an effort by Apple to simplify the computer to its barest essentials. Journalist Jason Snell called the machine an example of Jobs and Ive's obsession with a "Black Box"—dense, miniaturized computers hidden within a pleasing shell hiding the "magic" of its technology. As the Cube has no fan, the design started with the heat sink. The power button that turned on with a wave or touch was accomplished via the use of capacitive sensing. The proprietary plastics formula for the housing took Apple six months to develop. Effort spent developing the Cube would pioneer new uses and processes for materials at Apple that benefitted later products. Because of the technology included in the Cube, Apple's engineers had a tough time keeping the total cost low. The base price for the Cube at time of its release was $1,799. Advertising director Ken Segall recalled that Jobs learned of the product's price shortly before an ad agency meeting, and was left "visibly shaken" by the news, realizing that the high price might cause the product's failure.

== Release and reception ==
Rumors of a cube-shaped Apple computer leaked weeks in advance, and some sites posted purported pictures. The G4 Cube was announced at Macworld Expo on July 19, 2000, as an end-of-show "one more thing". Jobs touted it as combining the power of the Power Mac G4 with a sleek design and miniaturization Apple learned from producing the iMac. Alongside the Cube, Apple introduced a new mouse, keyboard, and displays to complement the machine.

The machine's size and looks were immediately divisive, which Macworld editor Andrew Gore took as an indication that Apple had succeeded in creating a cutting-edge product. The design was a point of praise and of jokes, compared to a Borg cube, toasters, or a box of Kleenex tissues. Others compared it to the NeXTcube. Ive and the design team were so amused by the comparison to a tissue box that they used spare Cube shells for that purpose in their studio.

Reviews were generally positive. Peter H. Lewis, writing for The New York Times, called the computer the most attractive on the market, and that the machine, combined with Apple's displays and peripherals, created "desk sculpture". PC Magazine Australia said that after changing the look of computers with the iMac, the G4 Cube had raised the bar for competitors even further. Gore called the Cube a work of art that felt more like sculpture than a piece of technology, but noted that one had to live with compromises made in the service of art. Walt Mossberg, writing for The Wall Street Journal, called it the "most gorgeous personal computer" that he had ever seen.

Critics noted that to get easy access to plug and unplug peripherals, users must tip the entire machine—risking accidental sleep activation or dropping the smooth plastic computer entirely. Macworld found the touch-sensitive power button too sensitive and they accidentally activated sleep mode regularly. They reported that the stock 5400-rpm hard drive and 64 MB of RAM on the base model slowed the system considerably.

The Cube won several international design awards on release, and PC Magazine's best desktop computer for its Technical Innovation Awards. The G4 Cube and its peripherals were acquired and showcased by The Museum of Modern Art alongside other Apple products, and a Cube is also held in the collections of the American Museum of Natural History and Powerhouse Museum.

=== Sales ===
The introduction of the Cube did not fit with the focused product lineup Jobs had introduced since his return to Apple, leaving it without a clear audience. It was as expensive as a similarly equipped Power Mac, but without extra room for more storage or PCI slots. It was likewise much more expensive than an upgraded consumer iMac. Jobs imagined that creative professionals and designers would want one, and that the product was so great that it would inform buying patterns.

Sales for the Cube were much lower than expected. Returning from the brink of bankruptcy, Apple had eleven profitable quarters before the Cube's announcement, but Apple's end-of-year financials for 2000 missed predicted revenues by $180 million. Part of the drop in profit was attributed to the Cube, with only one third as many units sold as Apple had expected, creating a $90 million shortfall in revenue targets. The Cube counted for 29,000 of the Macs Apple shipped in the quarter, compared to 308,000 iMacs. Retailers had excess product, leaving Apple with a large amount of unsold inventory heading into 2001 it had expected to last until March. The computer appealed to high-end customers who wanted a small and sleek design, but Jobs admitted that audience was smaller than expected. In February 2001, Apple lowered the price on the 500 MHz model and added new memory, hard drive, and graphics options. These updates made little difference, and sales continued to decline. In the first quarter of 2001, only 12,000 units were sold, representing just 1.6% of the company's total computer sales.

In addition to the product's high price, the Cube suffered cosmetic issues. Early buyers noticed cracks caused by the injection-molded plastic process. The idea of a design-focused product having aesthetic flaws turned into a negative public relations story for Apple, and dissuaded potential buyers for whom the design was its main appeal. The Cube's radical departure from a conventional personal computer alienated potential buyers, and exacerbated Apple's struggles in the market competing with the performance of Windows PCs. Macworld's Benj Edwards wrote that consumers treated the Cube as "an underpowered, over-expensive toy or [...] an emotionally inaccessible, ultra-geometric gray box suspended in an untouchable glass prison". The lack of internal expansion and reliance on less-common USB and FireWire peripherals also hurt the computer's chances of success.

Jobs clearly loved the computer, but was quick to discontinue the underperforming product. On July 3, 2001, an Apple press release made the unusual statement that the computer—rather than being canceled or discontinued—was having its production "suspended indefinitely", due to low demand. Apple did not rule out an upgraded Cube model in the future, but considered it unlikely. Business journalist Karen Blumenthal called the Cube the first big failure by Jobs since his return to Apple. Jobs's ability to quickly move on the mistake left the Cube a "blip" in Apple's history, according to Segall—a quickly forgotten failure among other successful innovations.

== Legacy ==
Though Apple CEO Tim Cook called the Cube "a spectacular failure" and the product sold only 150,000 units before being discontinued, it became highly popular with a small but enthusiastic group of fans. Macworld's Benj Edwards wrote that the Cube was a product ahead of its time; its appeal to fans years after it was discontinued was a testament to its vision. After its discontinuation the product fetched high prices from resellers, and a cottage industry developed selling upgrades and modifications to make the machine run faster or cooler. John Gruber wrote 20 years after its introduction that the Cube was a "worthy failure [...] Powerful computers needed to get smaller, quieter, and more attractive. The Cube pushed the state of the art forward." CNET called the machine "an iconic example of millennium-era design". Its unconventional and futuristic appearance earned it a spot as a prop in several films and television shows, including Absolutely Fabulous, The Drew Carey Show, and 24. Sixteen Cubes were also used to power the displays of the computer consoles in Star Trek: Enterprise.

Although the Cube failed commercially, it influenced future Apple products. The efforts at miniaturizing computer components would benefit future computers like the flatscreen iMac G4, while the efforts Apple spent learning how to precision machine parts of the Cube would be integral to the design of aluminum MacBooks. The Mac mini fit an entire computer in a shell one-fifth the size of the Cube and retained some of the Cube's design philosophies. In comparison to the high price of the Cube, the Mini retailed for $499 and became a successful product that remains part of Apple's lineup. The translucent cube shape would return with the design for the flagship Apple Fifth Avenue store in New York City. Capacitive touch would reappear in the iPod and iPhone lines, and the Cube's vertical thermal design and lattice grille pattern were echoed by the 2013 and 2019 versions of the Mac Pro.

== Specifications ==
| Model | Power Mac G4 Cube |
|---|---|
| Model identifier | PowerMac5,1 |
| Processor | 450 MHz or 500 MHz PowerPC G4 |
| Memory | 128 MB up to 1.5 GB of PC100 SDRAM2 |
| Graphics | ATI Rage 128 Pro with 16 MB SDRAM, Nvidia GeForce2 MX with 32 MB SDRAM, or ATI Radeon with 32 MB DDR SDRAM |
| Hard drive | 20 GB, 40 GB, or 60 GB Ultra ATA/66 Hard Drive |
| Optical drive | CD-RW or DVD-ROM |
| Connectivity | Optional AirPort 802.11b 10/100 BASE-T Ethernet; 56k V.90 modem |
| Peripherals | 2× USB 1.1; 2× FireWire 400 |
| Video out | VGA and ADC |
| Dimensions | 9.8 × 7.7 × 7.7 inches (25 × 20 × 20 cm) |
| Weight | 14 pounds (6.4 kg) |

Timeline of Power Macintosh models
See also: List of Mac models
