= Mac OS 9 =

1999 operating system version

- Version of the classic Mac OS operating system
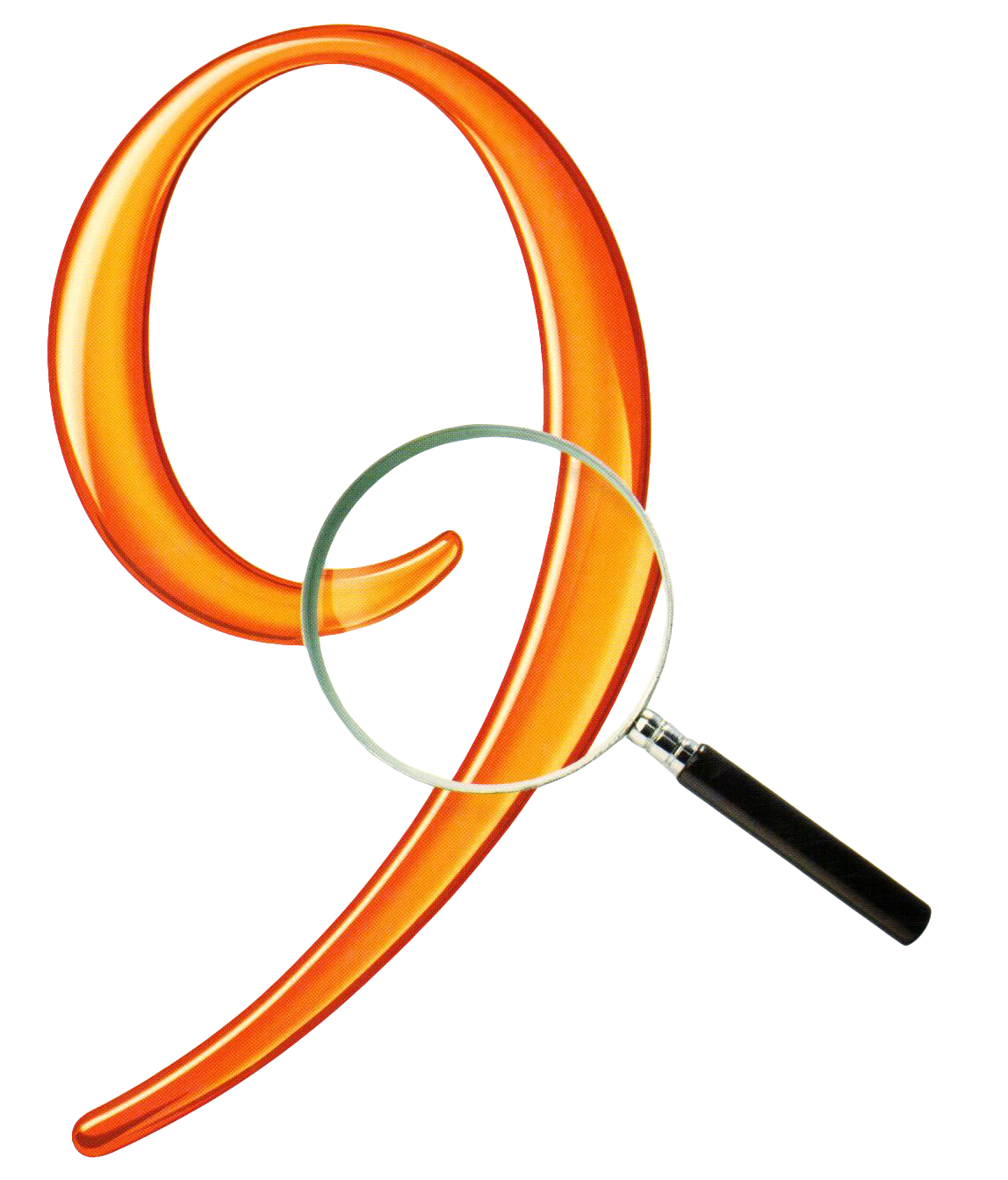

- Screenshot of Mac OS 9.2.2
- Developer: Apple Computer
- OS family: Macintosh
- Working state: No longer supported: Can Also be Historic unsupported
- Source model: Closed source
- Released to manufacturing: October 23, 1999; 27 years ago
- Latest release: 9.2.2 / December 5, 2001; 24 years ago
- Supported platforms: PowerPC
- Kernel type: Microkernel
- Default user interface: Apple Platinum
- License: Proprietary
- Preceded by: Mac OS 8
- Succeeded by: Mac OS X 10.0; Mac OS X Server 1.0
- Official website: Apple - Products - Mac OS 9 at the Wayback Machine (archived November 9, 2000)
- Tagline: Your Internet co-pilot.

Support status
- Historical, unsupported as of February 1, 2002

Mac OS 9 is the ninth and final major release of the classic Mac OS operating system for Macintosh computers, developed by Apple. Released on October 23, 1999, it was promoted by Apple as "The Best Internet Operating System Ever", reflecting new Internet features including the Sherlock 2 search tool, integration with the company's iTools online services, and improvements to Open Transport networking.

Mac OS 9 introduced features including an automated Software Update function and multi-user support, but retained the cooperative multitasking and memory architecture of earlier versions of the classic Mac OS, lacking protected memory and full pre-emptive multitasking. It was succeeded by Mac OS X 10.0 in 2001, the first release of the Mac OS X operating system family.

Apple ended development of Mac OS 9 in late 2001 as it transitioned to Mac OS X. The final Mac OS 9 updates focused on compatibility with the Classic Environment and Carbon applications. At the 2002 Worldwide Developers Conference, Steve Jobs opened his keynote with a mock funeral for Mac OS 9, symbolizing Apple's transition to Mac OS X.

== Features ==
Apple billed Mac OS 9 as including "50 new features" and heavily marketed its Sherlock 2 software, which introduced a "channels" feature for searching different online resources and introduced a QuickTime-like metallic appearance. Mac OS 9 also featured integrated support for Apple's suite of Internet services known as iTools (later re-branded as .Mac, then MobileMe, which was replaced by iCloud) and included improved TCP/IP functionality with Open Transport 2.5.

Other features new to Mac OS 9 include:

- Integrated support for multiple user accounts without using At Ease.
- Support for voice login through VoicePrint passwords.
- Keychain, a feature allowing users to save passwords and textual data encrypted in protected keychains.
- A Software Update control panel for automatic download and installation of Apple system software updates.
- A redesigned Sound control panel and support for USB audio.
- Speakable Items 2.0, also known as PlainTalk, featuring improved speech synthesis and recognition along with AppleScript integration.
- Improved font management through FontSync.
- Remote Access Personal Server 3.5, including support for TCP/IP clients over Point-to-Point Protocol (PPP).
- An updated version of AppleScript with support for TCP/IP.
- Personal File Sharing over TCP/IP.
- USB Printer Sharing, a control panel allowing certain USB printers to be shared across a TCP/IP network.
- 128-bit file encryption in the Finder.
- Support for files larger than 2 GB.
- Unix volume support.
- CD Burning in the Finder (introduced in Mac OS 9.1).
- Addition of a "Window" menu to the Finder (introduced in Mac OS 9.1)

An upgrade from OS 8 to OS 9 was priced at US$99 (equivalent to $191 in 2025), but all later OS 9 updates were offered for free.

== Mac OS 9 and the Classic Environment ==
PowerPC versions of Mac OS X prior to 10.5 Leopard include a compatibility layer called Classic, enabling users to run applications and hardware requiring Mac OS 9 from within OS X. This is achieved through running Mac OS 9 without access to its Finder inside OS X. This requires Mac OS 9 to be installed on the machine, even though most Macs that can run the Classic environment are not necessarily able to boot into Mac OS 9 natively. Some Mac OS 9 applications do not run well in Classic; they demonstrate screen redraw problems and lagging performance. In addition, some drivers and other pieces of software which directly interact with the hardware fail to work properly.

In May 2002, at Apple's Worldwide Developers Conference in San Jose, California, Steve Jobs, accompanied by a coffin, held a mock funeral to announce that Apple had stopped the development of Mac OS 9. The final version of Mac OS 9 and the "classic" Mac OS was Mac OS 9.2.2, released in December 2001.

In June 2005, Jobs announced that the Macintosh platform would be transitioning to Intel x86 microprocessors. Developer documentation of the Rosetta PowerPC emulation layer revealed that applications written for Mac OS 8 or 9 would not run on x86-based Macs. The Classic Environment remains in the PowerPC version of 10.4 Tiger, but x86 versions of OS X and the PowerPC version of 10.5 Leopard do not support the Classic environment.

== Mac OS 9 and other Mac computers ==
In January 2002, Mac OS X displaced Mac OS 9 as the default operating system for all Macs produced from that point forward beginning with 10.1.2. Despite this, Mac OS 9 continued to be preinstalled on some Macs (especially for Macs equipped with a PowerPC G4 processor) even as late as 2004, despite having its development stopped in late 2001. These Macs, despite coming with Mac OS X by default, also had Mac OS 9 preinstalled alongside the former to allow one to boot into Mac OS 9 natively if the user chooses to do so, and allows the ability to run Classic Mac OS applications natively without resorting to the Classic environment in Mac OS X. This is especially important for applications that can directly access the computer's hardware, as well as for some applications that may have issues when running on the Classic environment. Most G4 Macs made prior to 2003 had both operating systems preinstalled alongside each other in a dual-boot configuration (with Mac OS X being selected as the default option), where they can be accessed via a boot menu accessible upon startup.

Some Macs that were released with higher CPU clock speeds (i.e. 1 GHz or higher) are also capable of running Mac OS 9. This includes the 867 MHz—1.25 GHz Mirrored Drive Doors Power Mac G4 and the 867 MHz—1 GHz Antimony titanium PowerBook G4 ("TiBook"), which were released in August 2002 and November 2002 respectively. The Antimony PowerBook G4s in particular were the last PowerBook models that came with Mac OS 9 preinstalled alongside Mac OS X, as later models only came with Mac OS X. Despite having G4 processors with faster clock speeds of up to 1.25 GHz and 1 GHz respectively on some models (with some Power Mac G4 models even having dual G4 processors as well), they were able to run Mac OS 9 without any issues.

The majority of Macs released in 2003 onwards only came preinstalled with Mac OS X and are incapable of booting into Mac OS 9. Most G4 Macs released during this period that have a 1 GHz or higher processor never had their "Mac OS ROM" boot files updated to allow those Macs to officially boot into Mac OS 9 natively outside of the Classic environment. Macs equipped with a PowerPC G5 processor are unable to boot into Mac OS 9 natively because support for PowerPC G5 processors is absent on Mac OS 9 (Mac OS 9 only supports G3 and G4 processors as of Mac OS 9.2.2). The only options for running Mac OS 9 (and therefore Classic Mac OS applications) on G5 Macs is the Classic environment in Mac OS X as well as other emulation software such as SheepShaver.

The last Macs released that had Mac OS 9 preinstalled was a rerelease of the 2002 Mirrored Drive Doors Power Mac G4 in June 2003, which was launched around the same time as the Power Mac G5 due to a perceived demand for Mac OS 9 machines. This model ended up as being one of the last Mac models overall to officially boot into Mac OS 9, making the Power Mac G4 series the last Macintosh computer to come preinstalled with Mac OS 9 after the introduction of Mac OS X. Production of this model (as well as the original version of the Power Mac G5 from 2003) was discontinued in June 2004, a year after its rerelease, which was three years after Mac OS 9 stopped development in late 2001 and two years after Mac OS X displaced Mac OS 9 as the default operating system in early 2002.

In recent years, unofficial patches have been made for Mac OS 9 and the "Mac OS ROM" to allow unsupported G4 Macs to boot into Mac OS 9 natively; this practice is not officially supported by Apple.

== Other uses ==
Aside from Apple-branded hardware, Mac OS 9 can also be operated in other environments such as Windows and Unix. This includes emulation software such as the aforementioned SheepShaver. While it does provide PowerPC processor support, especially on Intel-based Macs, it can only run up to Mac OS 9.0.4 because it does not emulate a memory management unit. QEMU is another piece of software that has PowerPC emulation and is able to run all versions of Mac OS 9 up to Mac OS 9.2.2.

== Version history ==
Version	Release date	Changes	Codename	Price
9.0	October 23, 1999	Initial release	Sonata	US$99
9.0.2	February 2000	Shipped with PowerBook (FireWire)	—N/a	Free
9.0.3	March 2000	Shipped with iMac/iMac DV/iMac DV SE	—N/a	Free
9.0.4	April 4, 2000	Improved USB and FireWire support and other bug fixes	Minuet	Free
9.1	January 9, 2001	Memory management unit required. Integrated Disc Burning within Finder, implementation of Finder 'Window' menu. Improved stability	Fortissimo	Free
9.2	July 18, 2001	G3 processor required. Improved speed and Classic Environment support	Moonlight	Free
9.2.1	August 21, 2001	Minor bug fixes	Limelight	Free
9.2.2	December 5, 2001	Bug fixes relating to Classic Environment	LU1	Free

Updates to Mac OS 9 include 9.0.4, 9.1, 9.2.1, and 9.2.2. Mac OS 9.0.4 was a collection of bug fixes primarily relating to USB and FireWire support. Mac OS 9.1 included integrated CD burning support in the Macintosh Finder and added a new Window menu in the Finder for switching between open windows. Mac OS 9.2 increased performance noticeably and improved Classic Environment support.

== Compatibility ==
Macintosh Model	9.0	9.1	9.2.1	9.2.2
Power Macintosh 6100	Yes	Yes: Must install from CD	No	
Power Macintosh 7100	Yes	Yes: Must install from CD	No	
Power Macintosh 8100	Yes	Yes: Must install from CD	No	
PowerBook 2300	Yes	Yes	No	
PowerBook 2400c^{[C]}	Yes	Yes	No	
PowerBook 5300	Yes	Yes	No	
PowerBook 1400^{[C]}	Yes	Partial: Password Security unsupported	No	
PowerBook 3400^{[C]}	Yes	Yes: Hard disk driver must not be updated	No	
Power Macintosh 5200 LC	Yes	Yes	No	
Power Macintosh 5300 LC	Yes	Yes	No	
Power Macintosh 5500^{[C]}	Yes	Yes	No	
Power Macintosh 4400	Yes	Yes	No	
Power Macintosh 6200^{[C]}	Yes	Yes	No	
Power Macintosh 6300^{[C]}	Yes	Yes	No	
Power Macintosh 6400^{[C]}	Yes	Yes	No	
Power Macintosh 6500^{[C]}	Yes	Yes	No	
Power Macintosh 7200^{[C]}	Yes	Yes	No	
Power Macintosh 7300^{[C]}	Yes	Yes	No	
Power Macintosh 7500^{[C]}	Yes	Yes	No	
Power Macintosh 8500^{[C]}	Yes	Yes	No	
Power Macintosh 7600^{[C]}	Yes	Yes	No	
Power Macintosh 8600^{[C]}	Yes	Yes	No	
Power Macintosh 9600^{[C]}	Yes	Yes	No	
Twentieth Anniversary Macintosh^{[C]}	Yes	Yes	No	
PowerBook G3	Yes	Yes	No	
PowerBook G3 Series	Yes	Yes	Yes	Yes
PowerBook (FireWire)	Yes: Machine-specific version only	Yes	Yes	Yes
PowerBook G4^{[A]}	No	Yes: Machine-specific version only	Yes	Yes
PowerBook G4 (Gigabit Ethernet)^{[A]}	No	No	Yes: Machine-specific version only	Yes
PowerBook G4 (DVI)^{[A]}	No	No		Yes: Machine-specific version only
PowerBook G4 (1 GHz/867 MHz)^{[A]}	No	No		Yes: Machine-specific version only
PowerBook G4 (12-inch)^{[B]}	No	No		Partial: Classic Environment only
PowerBook G4 (17-inch)^{[B]}	No	No		Partial: Classic Environment only
PowerBook G4 (12-inch DVI)^{[B]}	No	No		Partial: Classic Environment only
PowerBook G4 (12-inch 1.33 GHz)^{[B]}	No	No		Partial: Classic Environment only
PowerBook G4 (12-inch 1.5 GHz)^{[B]}	No	No		Partial: Classic Environment only
PowerBook G4 (15-inch FW 800)^{[B]}	No	No		Partial: Classic Environment only
PowerBook G4 (15-inch 1.5/1.33 GHz)^{[B]}	No	No		Partial: Classic Environment only
PowerBook G4 (17-inch 1.33 GHz)^{[B]}	No	No		Partial: Classic Environment only
PowerBook G4 (17-inch 1.5 GHz)^{[B]}	No	No		Partial: Classic Environment only
iBook	Yes	Yes	Yes	Yes
iBook (FireWire)	Yes: Machine-specific version only	Yes	Yes	Yes
iBook (Dual USB)^{[A]}	No	Yes: Machine-specific version only	Yes	Yes
iBook (Late 2001)^{[A]}	No	Yes: Machine-specific version only	Yes	Yes
iBook (14.1 LCD)^{[A]}	No	No	Partial: Classic Environment only	Yes
iBook (16 VRAM)^{[A]}	No	No	Partial: Classic Environment only	Yes
iBook (Opaque 16 VRAM)^{[A]}	No	No	Partial: Classic Environment only	Yes
iBook (32 VRAM)^{[A]}	No	No	Partial: Classic Environment only	Yes
iBook (14.1 LCD 32 VRAM)^{[A]}	No	No	Partial: Classic Environment only	Yes
iBook (Early 2003)^{[A]}	No	No	Partial: Classic Environment only	Yes: Machine-specific version only
iBook G4^{[B]}	No	No	Partial: Classic Environment only	Partial: Classic Environment only
iBook G4 (14-inch)^{[B]}	No	No	Partial: Classic Environment only	Partial: Classic Environment only
iBook G4 (Early 2004)^{[B]}	No	No	Partial: Classic Environment only	Partial: Classic Environment only
Power Macintosh G3 All-In-One	Yes			
Power Macintosh G3	Yes			
Power Macintosh G3 (Blue and White)	Yes			
iMac G3	Yes			
iMac G3 (266 MHz, 333 MHz)	Yes			
iMac G3 (Slot Loading)	Yes			
iMac G3 (Summer 2000)	Yes: Machine-specific version only	Yes	Yes	
iMac G3 (Early 2001)^{[A]}	No	Yes: Machine-specific version only	Yes	
iMac G3 (Summer 2001)^{[A]}	No	Yes: Machine-specific version only	Yes	
iMac G4^{[A]}	No			Yes
iMac G4 (February 2003)^{[B]}	No			Partial: Classic Environment only
iMac G4 (17-inch 1 GHz)^{[B]}	No			Partial: Classic Environment only
iMac G4 (USB 2.0)^{[B]}	No			Partial: Classic Environment only
iMac G5^{[B]}	No			Partial: Classic Environment only
iMac G5 (Ambient Light Sensor)^{[B]}	No			Partial: Classic Environment only
iMac G5 (iSight)^{[B]}	No			Partial: Classic Environment only
eMac^{[A]}	No			Yes
eMac (ATI Graphics CD-ROM drive)^{[A]}	No			Yes: Machine-specific version only
eMac (ATI Graphics Combo drive)^{[A]}	No			Yes: Machine-specific version only
eMac (ATI Graphics SuperDrive)^{[B]}	No			Partial: Classic Environment only
eMac (USB 2.0)^{[B]}	No			Partial: Classic Environment only
eMac (2005)^{[B]}	No			Partial: Classic Environment only
Power Mac G4 (PCI Graphics)	Yes	Yes		
Power Mac G4 (AGP Graphics)	Yes	Yes		
Power Mac G4 (Gigabit Ethernet)	Yes: Machine-specific version only	Yes		
Power Mac G4 Cube	Yes: Machine-specific version only	Yes		
Power Mac G4 (Digital Audio)^{[A]}	No	Yes: Machine-specific version only	Yes	
Power Mac G4 (QuickSilver)^{[A]}	No	No	Yes	
Power Mac G4 (QuickSilver 2002)^{[A]}	No			Yes: Machine-specific version only
Power Mac G4 (Mirrored Drive Doors)^{[A]}	No			Yes: Machine-specific version only
Power Mac G4 (FW 800)^{[B]}	No			Partial: Classic Environment only
Power Mac G4 (Mirrored Drive Doors 2003)^{[A]}	No			Yes: Machine-specific version only
Power Mac G5	No			Partial: Classic Environment only
Power Mac G5 (June 2004)	No			Partial: Classic Environment only
Power Mac G5 (Late 2004)	No			Partial: Classic Environment only
Power Mac G5 (Early 2005)	No			Partial: Classic Environment only
Power Mac G5 (Late 2005)	No			Partial: Classic Environment only
Mac Mini (G4)^{[B]}	No			Yes (unofficially)

1. ^{1}Some newest G3 and most G4 Macs can only run at least Mac OS 9.1, and some only run at least Mac OS 9.2. This is because the late development of G3 Macs and the mid-development of G4 Macs was during the development of Mac OS 9 and only the versions the G4 Macs support were designed to be compatible with those G4 Macs.
2. ^{1}Some newest G4 and all G5 Macs can only run at least Mac OS 9.2, and can only run its compatible versions of Mac OS 9 in OS X's Classic Environment because the "Mac OS ROM" was never updated to allow those Macs, which were developed during the OS X era, to directly boot it (but probably continued to run in userspace, with the restriction that it would only run at least Mac OS 9.2, so it was still supported in the Classic Environment).
3. ^{1}Although Mac OS 9.2 to 9.2.2 officially requires a G3 processor as a minimum, certain second generation Power Macs can be made to run it using a third party program called "OS9 Helper", which allows for such benefits like support for the latest ATI classic Mac OS drivers, full iPod compatibility, and the ability to run DVD Studio Pro 1.5 or 1.2.1 and Final Cut Pro 3, among other things.

== See also ==
- List of Apple operating systems

Timeline of Mac operating systems

Preceded by Mac OS 8	Mac OS 9; 1999	Succeeded by Mac OS X 10.0 (Cheetah)
