= Genesi =

International technology and consulting group

Genesi Group
- Company type: Private
- Industry: Computer hardware, Software, IT services, IT consulting
- Founded: 3 January 2003
- Founder: William H. Buck; Raquel Velasco
- Headquarters: San Antonio, Texas; Mexico City, Mexico; Frankfurt, Germany
- Area served: Worldwide
- Website: genesi-tech.com

Genesi is an international group of technology and consulting companies in the United States, Mexico and Germany. It is most widely known for designing and manufacturing ARM architecture and Power ISA-based computing devices. The Genesi Group consists of Genesi USA Inc., Genesi Americas LLC, Genesi Europe UG, Red Efika, bPlan GmbH and the affiliated non-profit organization Power2People.

As of 2012, Genesi was an official Linaro partner and its software development team was instrumental in moving Linux on the ARM architecture towards a wider adoption of the hard-float application binary interface, which was incompatible with most existing applications but provided large performance gains for many use cases as of 2012.

== Products ==
The main products of Genesi are ARM-based computers that were designed to be inexpensive, quiet and highly energy efficient, and a custom Open Firmware compliant firmware. All products can run a multitude of operating systems.

=== Current products ===
- Aura – A comprehensive abstraction layer for embedded and desktop devices, with UEFI and IEEE1275. Desktop systems with AGP or PCI/PCI Express may take advantage of an embedded x86/BIOS emulator providing boot functionality for standard graphics cards
- EFIKA MX53
- EFIKA MX6

=== Discontinued products ===
- EFIKA MX Smarttop – A highly energy efficient and compact computing device (complete system) powered by a Freescale ARM iMX515 CPU
- EFIKA MX Smartbook – A 10″ smartbook (complete system) powered by the Freescale ARM iMX515 CPU
- High Density Blade – PowerPC based high density blade server
- Home Media Center – PowerPC based digital video recorder
- EFIKA 5200B – A small Open Firmware-based motherboard powered by a Freescale MPC5200B SoC processor with 128 MB RAM, a 44-pin ATA connector for a 2.5" hard drive, sound in/out, USB, Ethernet, serial port, and a PCI slot
- Open Client – thin clients available with Freescale's Power Architecture or ARM SoCs
- Pegasos – An Open Firmware-based MicroATX motherboard powered by a PowerPC G3/G4 microprocessor, featuring PCI slots, AGP, Ethernet, USB, DDR and FireWire
- Open Desktop Workstation – A Pegasos II based computer featuring a Freescale PowerPC 7447 processor. Complete specifications for the hardware are available through Genesi's PowerDeveloper.org website

== Community support ==
Genesi designed and maintains PowerDeveloper, an online platform for Genesi products and ARM products from other manufacturers. Via the PowerDeveloper Projects programs, hundreds of systems have been provided to the PowerDeveloper community so far, thereby supporting open source development in many countries. Linux distributions that directly benefited from the programs include but are not limited to Crux, Debian, Raspbian, Fedora, Gentoo, openSuSE and Ubuntu.

Genesi once funded the development of the MorphOS operating system but shifted its focus towards Linux in 2004. However, as of 2011, Genesi remains the main supporter of the operating system and continues to actively support its user and developer communities via the MorphZone social platform, which features discussion forums, a digital library, a software repository and a bounty system.
