= Open Desktop Workstation =

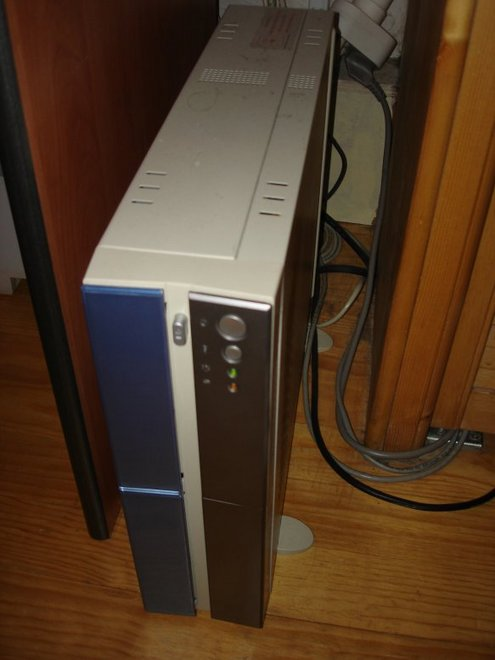
Genesi Open Desktop Workstation, built around the Pegasos II.

The Open Desktop Workstation, also referred to as ODW is a PowerPC based computer, by San Antonio-based Genesi. The ODW has an interchangeable CPU card allowing for a wide range of PowerPC microprocessors from IBM and Freescale Semiconductor.

It is a standardized version of the Pegasos II. It was the first open-source based PowerPC computer and gave PowerPC a host/target development environment. Genesi released the complete specification (design and component listing) free of charge. The ODW-derived Home Media Center won the Best in Show award at the Freescale Technology Forum in 2005. It also features an ATI certification and a "Ready for IBM Technology" certification.

It supports a variety of operating systems such as MorphOS, Linux, QNX and OpenSolaris. Manufacturing of the ODW was discontinued in favor of the EFIKA architecture.

== Specification ==
- Freescale 1.0 GHz MPC7447 processor
- 512 MB DDR RAM (two slots, up to 2 GB)
- 80 GB ATA100 hard disk
- Dual-Layer DVD±RW Drive
- Floppy disk support
- 3× PCI slots
- AGP based ATI Radeon 9250 graphics (DVI, VGA and S-Video out)
- 4× USB
- PS/2 mouse and keyboard support
- 3× FireWire 400 (two external)
- 2× Ethernet ports, 100 Mbit/s and 1 Gbit
- AC'97 sound – in/out, analog and digital (S/PDIF)
- PC game/MIDI-port
- Parallel and serial ports (supporting IrDA)
- MicroATX motherboard (236×172 mm)
- Small Footprint Case - (92×310×400 mm)
