= Symobi =

Symobi (System for mobile applications) is a proprietary modern and mobile real-time operating system. It was and is developed by the German company Miray Software, since 2002 partly in cooperation with the research team of Prof. Dr. Uwe Baumgarten at the Technical University of Munich. The graphical operating system is designed for the area of embedded and mobile systems. It is also often used on PCs for end users and in the field of industry.

== Design ==
The basis of Symobi is the message-oriented operating system μnOS, which is on its part based on the real-time microkernel Sphere. μnOS offers communication through message passing between all processes (from basic operating system service processes to application processes) using the integrated process manager. On the lowest level, the responsibility of the Sphere microkernel is to implement and enforce security mechanisms and resource management in real-time. Symobi itself additionally offers a complete graphical operating system environment with system services, a consistent graphical user interface, as well as standard programs and drivers.

== Classification ==
Symobi combines features from different fields of application in one operating system. As a modern operating system it offers separated, isolated processes, light-weight threads, and dynamic libraries, like Windows, Linux, and Unix for example. In the area of mobile embedded operating systems, through its low resource requirement and the support of mobile devices it resembles systems like Windows CE, SymbianOS or Palm OS. With conventional real-time operating systems like QNX or VxWorks it shares the real-time ability and the support of different processor architectures.

== History ==
The development of Sphere, μnOS and Symobi is based on the ideas and work of Konrad Foikis and Michael Haunreiter (founders of the company Miray Software), initiated during their schooldays, even before they started studying computer science. The basic concept was to combine useful and necessary features (like real-time and portability) with modern characteristics (like microkernel and inter-process communication etc.) to form a stable and reliable operating system. Originally, it was only supposed to serve as a basis for the different application programs developed by Foikis and Haunreiter during their studies. In 2000, Konrad Foikis and Michael Haunreiter founded the company Miray Software when they realised that μnOS was suited for far more than their own use. The cooperation with the Technical University of Munich already evolved two years later. In 2006, the first official version of Symobi was completed, and in autumn of the same year it was introduced in professional circles on the Systems exhibition.

== Support ==
Single-Core

- Intel: 80386, 80486, Pentium, Pentium Pro, Pentium II, Pentium III, Pentium 4, Core Solo, Core 2 Solo
- AMD: Élan SC410, Élan SC520, K6, K6-2, K6-III, Duron, Sempron, Athlon, Opteron
- VIA: Cyrix Mark II, Cyrix III, C3, C7, Eden
- Rise: mP6
- Marvell / Intel: PXA-250, PXA-255, PXA-270, IXP-420
- Motorola / Freescale: G2, G3, G4

Multi-Core

- Intel: Pentium 4, Core Duo, Core 2 Duo
- AMD: Athlon X2, Opteron

== Application areas ==
Symobi is suited for hand-held products (portable communicators, internet appliances), as well as for consumer appliances (set-top boxes, home gateways, games, consoles). Furthermore, it is used in the areas of automotive (control and infotainment systems), industrial control systems (motion control, process control), and point of sale (cashier systems, ticket machines, information terminals).

== Advantages and disadvantages ==
The operating system stands out through its real-time microkernel and its multi-processor ability. Furthermore, it is portable and therefore not bound to specific hardware platforms. Symobi's inter-process communication guarantees security and flexibility. It has a modern architecture and runs with only low resource requirements (processor, system memory). The system offers a Java-VM. In the area of standard appliances the operating system it not yet widely spread. It has only a rudimentary POSIX support and has restricted hardware support through drivers. In addition, Symobi is not an open source operating system and at present does not offer office applications, email functions, or a web browser.
