= 12-inch MacBook =

2010s line of Apple notebook computers

MacBook

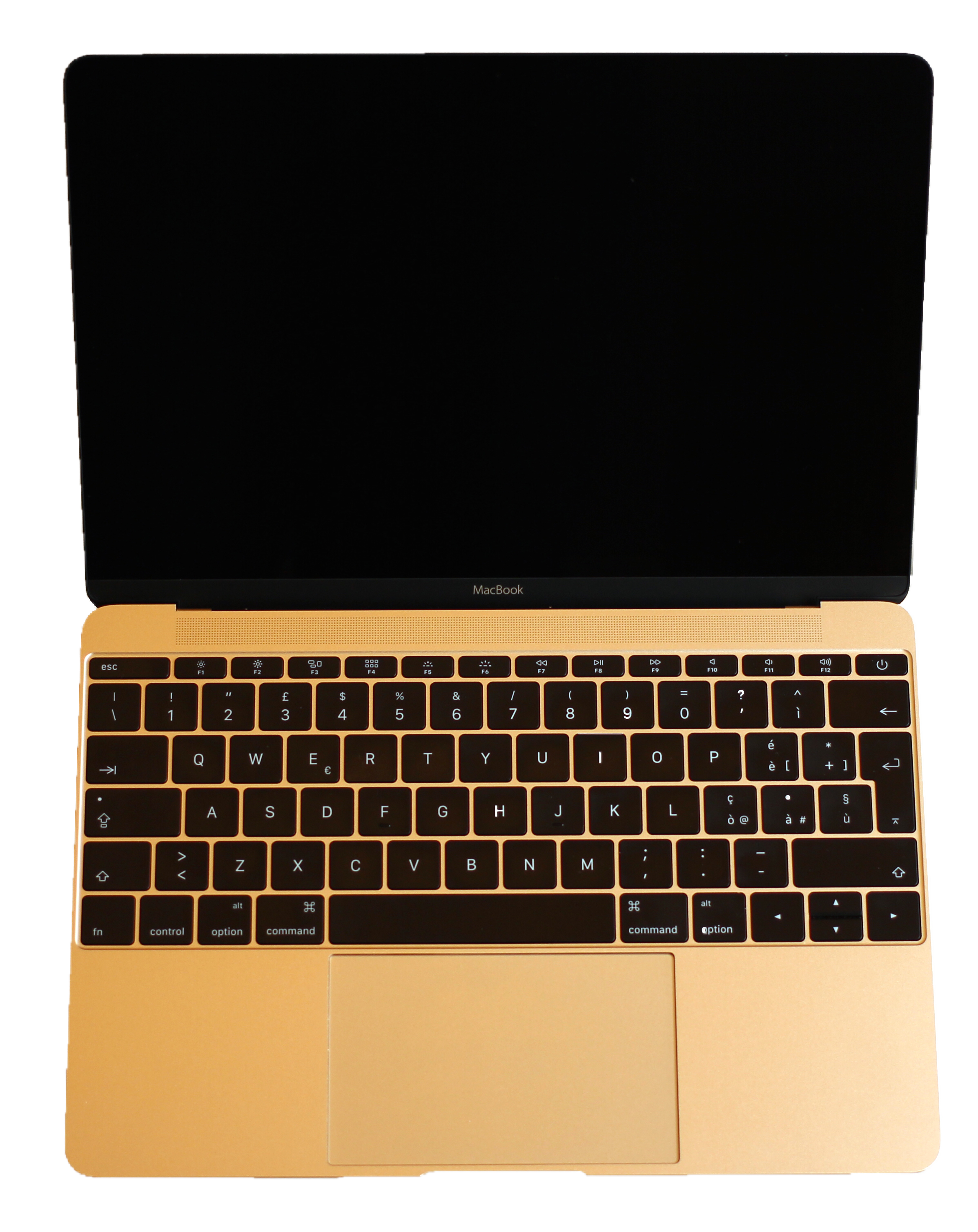
- MacBook (early 2015) in gold with ISO keyboard
- Also known as: 12 in (300 mm) MacBook, Retina MacBook, MacBook (Retina, 12-inch, Early 2015–2017)
- Developer: Apple
- Manufacturer: Apple
- Product family: MacBook
- Type: Subnotebook
- Released: April 10, 2015; 11 years ago (original release); June 5, 2017; 9 years ago (last release)
- Introductory price: US$1299, C$1549, €1449, £1249
- Discontinued: July 9, 2019; 7 years ago
- Operating system: macOS
- CPU: Intel Core m, m3, m5, m7, i5 or i7
- Graphics: Intel HD Graphics
- Predecessor: MacBook (2006–2012)
- Related: MacBook Air; MacBook Pro

The 12-inch MacBook (also called the Retina MacBook, officially marketed as the new MacBook) is a discontinued Mac laptop made by Apple between 2015 and 2019. It sat between the MacBook Air and MacBook Pro in Apple's laptop lineup. It shares the same name as its predecessor that was discontinued three years prior to its release.

Introduced in March 2015, it was more compact than any other notebook in the MacBook family at the time and included a Retina display, fanless design, and a Butterfly keyboard with lower key travel. It only had a single USB-C port, used for both power and data. It was revised in 2017, and discontinued in July 2019.

== Overview ==
The MacBook was announced at an Apple special event on March 9, 2015, and was released a month later on April 10. It employed Intel's Broadwell Core M processors at a TDP of around 4.5 watts to allow for a fanless design and a logic board that is much smaller than in previous MacBooks. It had a similar appearance to the MacBook Air, but was thinner and lighter, offered (at the time of introduction) more storage and memory, and a higher-resolution 2304×1440 Retina display, but lower processor and graphics performance. The MacBook has at times been available in space gray, silver, and gold finishes.

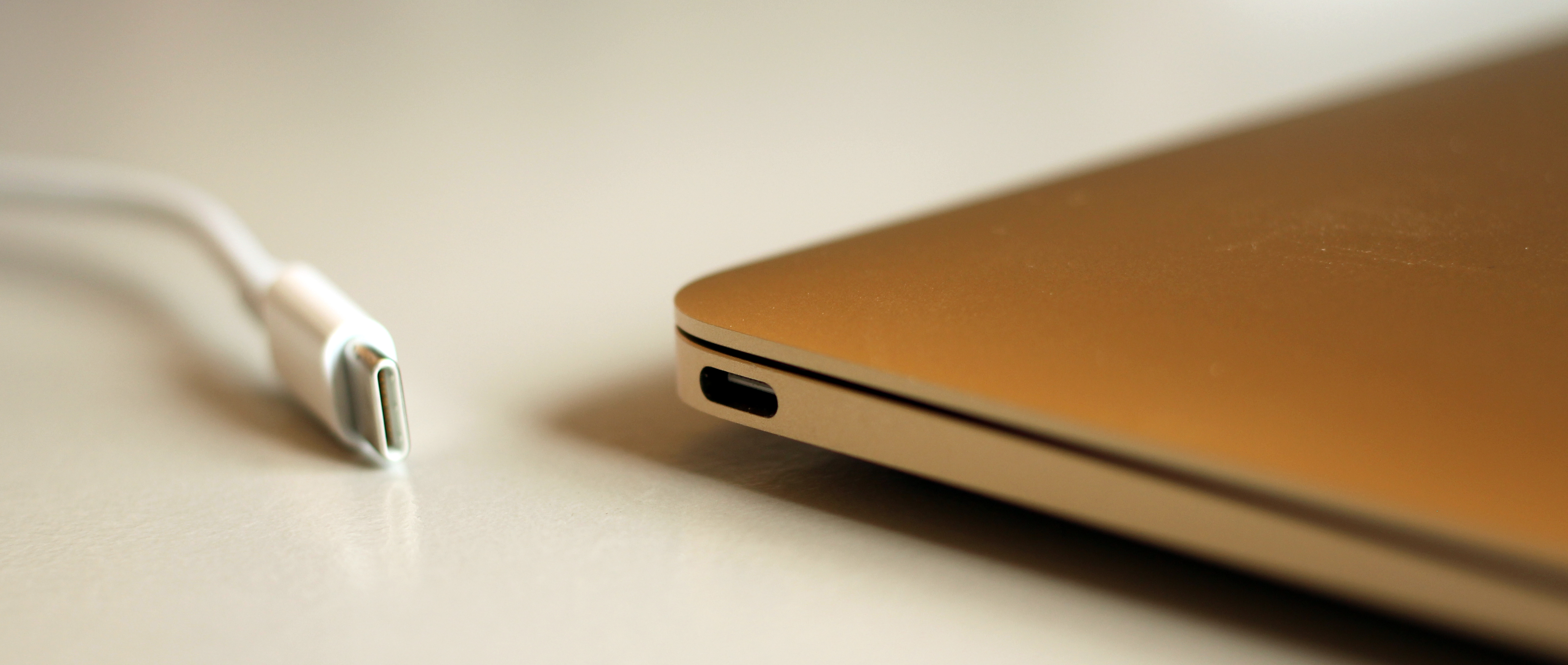
USB-C on MacBook

The MacBook has only one port, a single, multi-purpose USB-C port; it was the first Mac with USB-C. The port supports transmission speeds of up to 5 Gbit/s, and can be used for data, and audio/video output, and charging; it was the first MacBook without MagSafe charging. Apple markets an adapter that can provide a full-size USB-A connector, and a "Digital AV Multiport Adapter" with a charging pass-through, full-size USB-A port, and HDMI output. Although Thunderbolt 3 technology uses USB-C connectors, the MacBook's USB-C port does not support Thunderbolt. It was one of only two Macs, along with the 2012 Mac Pro, to not support Thunderbolt since it was introduced to Macs in 2011. Thunderbolt devices, such as storage media and the Apple Thunderbolt Display, are not compatible. Shortly after the MacBook's introduction, various companies began announcing cables and adapters for the USB-C port.

Despite its small size, it features a full-sized keyboard and a large trackpad. The MacBook introduced a new Butterfly keyboard, with traditional scissor mechanism keys replaced with a new, Apple-designed butterfly mechanism, making the keyboard thinner and, as Apple claims, individual keys more stable. The keyboard's backlight no longer consisted of a row of LEDs and a light guide panel, but instead used a single LED for each key. It also introduced the Force Touch trackpad, a solid-state trackpad that measures pressure sensitivity, and replicates a click with haptic feedback. The trackpad was later brought to the Magic Trackpad 2 and the 2015 MacBook Pro. A similar technology (3D Touch) is also used in the Apple Watch and introduced with the iPhone 6S.

The aluminum enclosure is 13.1 mm at its thickest point at the hinge end. The battery was custom-designed to fill the available space in the small enclosure. It uses a 39.7 watt-hour lithium-polymer terraced battery cell which was advertised to provide "all day" battery life. Apple claimed nine hours of Internet browsing or ten hours of iTunes movie playback. The battery was improved in the 2016 refresh, with Apple claiming ten hours for Internet browsing, and eleven hours of iTunes movie playback. The MacBook did not include any beryllium, BFRs, or PVCs in its construction. The display was made of arsenic-free glass. It was made of recyclable materials such as aluminum and glass, meets Energy Star 6.1 standards, and was rated EPEAT Gold.

On April 19, 2016, Apple updated the MacBook with Skylake Core M processors, Intel HD 515 graphics, faster memory, longer battery life, faster storage and a new rose gold finish.

On June 5, 2017, Apple updated the MacBook with Intel Kaby Lake m3, i5, and i7 processors (previously known as m3, m5, and m7). It featured the second-generation butterfly keyboard, which introduced new symbols for the control and option keys. It also features faster storage and memory. On October 30, 2018, Apple quietly eliminated two color options (rose gold and the original gold) and added a new color option (new gold) to match the Apple devices's 2018 color scheme.

On July 9, 2019, Apple quietly discontinued the MacBook line. On June 7, 2021, Apple announced macOS Monterey which dropped support for early 2015 model MacBook. On June 30, 2021, Apple added the early 2015 model MacBook to its "vintage products" list, making it eligible for only limited product support. On June 6, 2022, Apple announced macOS Ventura which dropped support for the early 2016 model MacBook. On June 5, 2023, Apple announced macOS Sonoma which dropped support for the 2017 model, marking the end of macOS updates to the family. On June 30, 2023, Apple added the early 2015 model MacBook to its "obsolete products" list, making it end of product support and discontinues all hardware service. On October 13, 2026, Apple adds the 2017 model MacBook to its "obsolete products" list, making it end of product support and discontinues all hardware service to the family.

== Design ==
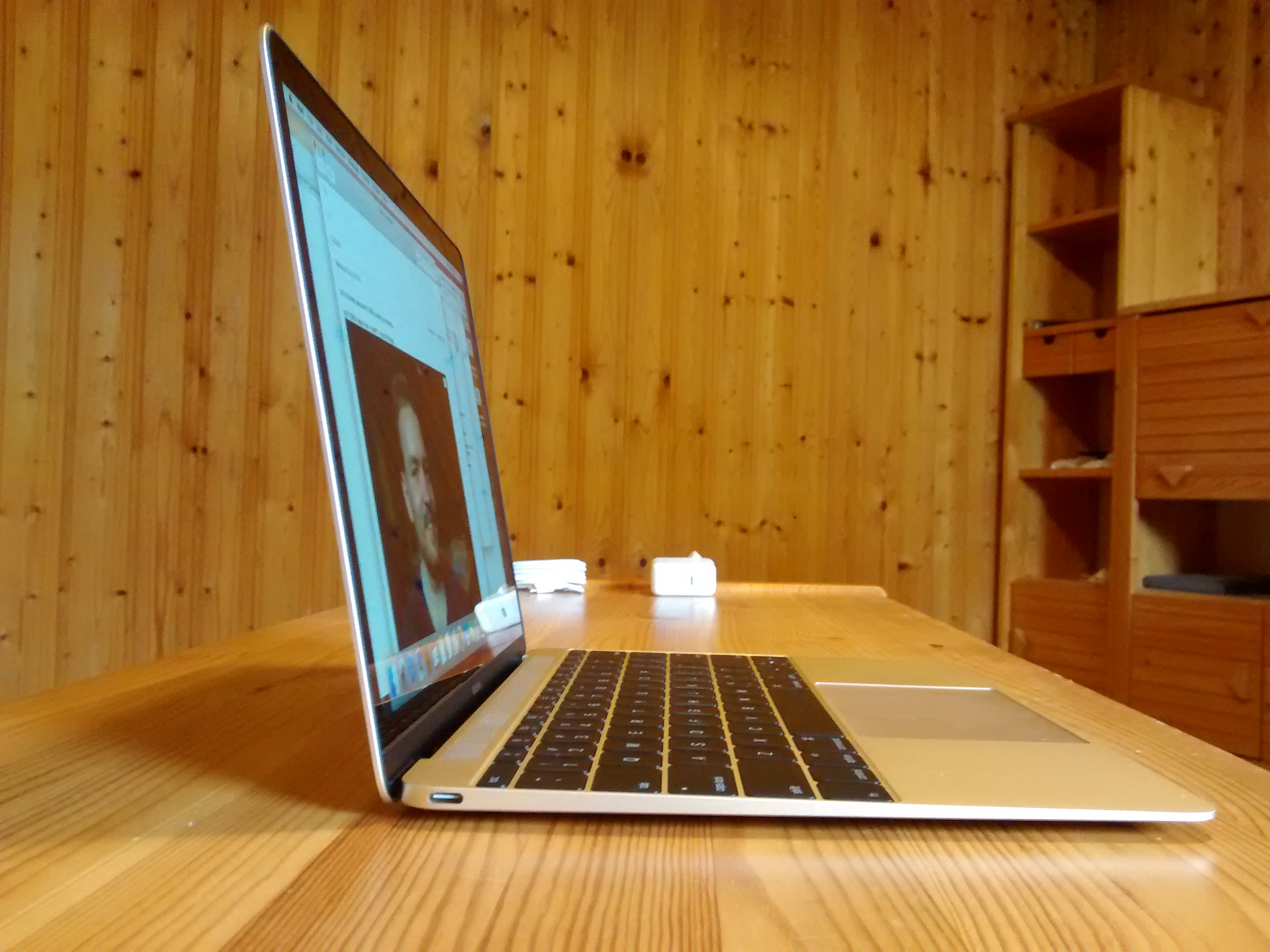
A side view of the MacBook

Externally, the MacBook follows the design of the MacBook Air with a tapered aluminum enclosure. It has a flush screen with black bezels similar to the MacBook Pro. The Apple logo on the rear of the display is glossy and opaque, rather than backlit and white as seen on every Apple notebook since the 1999 PowerBook G3 and 2001 iBook.

The design was very similar to the Touch Bar MacBook Pro (2016 - 2019) and the Retina MacBook Air (2018 - 2019), with a glass force touch trackpad, butterfly keyboard, and retina screen.

The letters on the MacBook's keyboard are in the San Francisco typeface, whereas previous notebooks made by Apple used VAG Rounded.

Apple updated the typeface of the model name MacBook on at the bottom of the screen bezel to San Francisco in the 2017 model.

== Reception ==
Reception for the MacBook was mixed. Critics praised the design and overall quality of the product, with some regarding it as a potential successor to the MacBook Air, as the Air had an aging design and low resolution screen. However, Apple continued to offer the MacBook Air while selling the MacBook at considerably higher price. Several described the MacBook as a limited first-generation proof-of-concept design for early adopters, and recommended against buying the MacBook until it reached greater maturity, and its price dropped sufficiently for mainstream adoption. The slow performance of the Intel Core M processor was regarded as the new MacBook's main deficiency, relative to the cheaper and faster MacBook Air and MacBook Pro. Among the other criticisms of the new MacBook are the lack of various popular ports, particularly USB Type-A ports, and that it only contains a single port which limits data transfer and overall convenience without the use of an adapter.

The keyboard received considerable criticism as being poor for long-term use: developer Marco Arment described the notebook's build and small size as "absolutely amazing, revolutionary, and mind-blowing... until you need to use the keyboard for something." He also criticised the trackpad as worse than on previous MacBooks, and said that he would be returning the model he had bought.

A report by AppleInsider had claimed that the updated butterfly keyboard fails twice as often as previous models, often due to particles stuck beneath the keys. Repairs for stuck keys have been estimated to cost more than $700. In May 2018, two class action lawsuits were filed against Apple regarding the keyboard issue with one alleging a "constant threat of nonresponsive keys and accompanying keyboard failure" and accusing Apple of not alerting consumers to the issue. In June 2018, Apple announced a Service Program to "service eligible MacBook and MacBook Pro keyboards, free of charge".

== Technical specifications ==
According to Apple, all of these models are obsolete. (Note: Apple products that have been discontinued for seven years and no longer receive hardware support or spare parts)

Model		Early 2015		Early 2016		2017	
Timeline	Announced	March 9, 2015		April 19, 2016		June 5, 2017	
Timeline	Released	April 10, 2015		April 19, 2016		June 6, 2017	
Timeline	Discontinued	April 19, 2016		June 5, 2017		July 9, 2019	
Timeline	Unsupported (Note: Mac products that were discontinued less than 5 years will not get macOS releases.)	September 26, 2023		September 16, 2024		September 15, 2025	
Timeline	Vintage (Note: Mac products that were discontinued between 5 and 7 years ago but still support the latest macOS software release. Hardware support provided only through Apple Service Providers in the United States and Turkey.)	June 30, 2021		July 31, 2022		October 8, 2024	
Timeline	Obsolete	June 30, 2023		September 23, 2024		October 14, 2026	
Production	Model identifier	MacBook8,1		MacBook9,1		MacBook10,1	
Production	Model number	A1534, EMC 2746		A1534, EMC 2991		A1534, EMC 3099	
Production	MSRP	US$1,299	US$1,599	US$1,299	US$1,599	US$1,299	US$1,599
Production	Order numbers	MJY32, MF855, MK4M2	MJY42, MF865, MK4N2	MLH72, MLHA2, MLHE2, MMGL2	MLH82, MLHC2, MLHF2, MMGM2	MNYF2, MNYH2, MNYK2, MNYM2, MRQN2	MNYG2, MNYJ2, MNYL2, MNYN2, MRQP2
Display		12" glossy widescreen LED-backlit Retina Display, 2304 × 1440 (16∶10), 226 px/in, with millions of colors (supported scaled resolutions: 2880 × 1800, 2560 × 1600 (default), 2048 × 1280)					
Webcam		iSight (480p)					
Performance	Processor	1.1 GHz 2-core Intel Core M-5Y31 Broadwell (Turbo Boost up to 2.4 GHz)	1.2 GHz 2-core Intel Core M-5Y51 Broadwell (Turbo Boost up to 2.6 GHz)	1.1 GHz 2-core Intel Core M3-6Y30 Skylake (cTDP Up mode, Turbo Boost up to 2.2 GHz)	1.2 GHz 2-core Intel Core M5-6Y54 Skylake (cTDP Up mode, Turbo Boost up to 2.7 GHz)	1.2 GHz 2-core Intel Core M3-7Y32 Kaby Lake processor (Turbo Boost up to 3.0 GHz)	1.3 GHz 2-core Intel Core i5-7Y54 Kaby Lake processor (Turbo Boost up to 3.2 GHz)
Performance	Processor	Optional 1.3 GHz 2-core Intel Core M-5Y71 Broadwell (Turbo Boost up to 2.9 GHz)		Optional 1.3 GHz 2-core Intel Core M7-6Y75 Skylake (cTDP Up mode, Turbo Boost up to 3.1 GHz)		Optional 1.3 GHz 2-core Intel Core i5-7Y54 Kaby Lake processor (Turbo Boost up to 3.2 GHz) or 1.4 GHz 2-core Intel Core i7-7Y75 Kaby Lake processor (Turbo Boost up to 3.6 GHz)	Optional 1.4 GHz 2-core Intel Core i7-7Y75 Kaby Lake processor (Turbo Boost up to 3.6 GHz)
Performance	Cache	4 MB L3 cache					
Performance	System bus	—N/a		4 GT/s OPI (max. theoretical bandwidth 4 GB/s)			
Performance	Memory	8 GB (1600 MHz LPDDR3 SDRAM)		8 GB (1866 MHz LPDDR3 SDRAM)		8 GB (1866 MHz LPDDR3 SDRAM); Optional 16 GB	
Performance	Graphics	Intel HD Graphics 5300		Intel HD Graphics 515		Intel HD Graphics 615	
Performance	Flash storage	256 GB NVMe/PCIe 2.0 ×4, 5.0 GT/s	512 GB NVMe/PCIe 2.0 ×4, 5.0 GT/s	256 GB NVMe/PCIe 3.0 ×2, 8.0 GT/s	512 GB NVMe/PCIe 3.0 ×2, 8.0 GT/s	256 GB NVMe	512 GB NVMe
Input/Output	Wi-Fi	Integrated 802.11a/b/g/n/ac (2.4 GHz and 5 GHz, up to 1.3 Gbit/s)					
Input/Output	Bluetooth	Bluetooth 4.0				Bluetooth 4.2	
Input/Output	USB	USB 3.1 Gen 1 over USB-C, up to 5 Gbit/s					
Input/Output	Audio	Speaker, 3.5mm Headphone Jack					
Input/Output	Video out	USB-C DisplayPort 1.2 Alternate Mode (max. 4096 × 2304 @ 48 Hz or 3840 × 2160 @ 60 Hz)		USB-C DisplayPort 1.2 Alternate Mode (max. 4096 × 2304 @ 60 Hz)			
Input/Output	Keyboard	Butterfly mechanism				Second-generation butterfly mechanism	
Power		39.7 Wh battery 29 watt USB-C power adapter		41.4 Wh battery 29 watt USB-C power adapter			
Appearance	Weight	2.03 pounds (0.92 kg)					
Appearance	Dimensions (width x depth x thickness)	11.04 × 7.74 × 0.14–0.52 in (280.42 × 196.60 × 3.56–13.21 mm)					
Appearance	Colors					After 2018:	
OS	Minimum	OS X 10.10 Yosemite		OS X 10.11 El Capitan		macOS 10.12 Sierra	
OS	Latest release	macOS 11 Big Sur		macOS 12 Monterey		macOS 13 Ventura	

== Supported operating systems ==
=== Supported macOS releases ===
OS release	Model		
OS release	Early 2015	Early 2016	2017
10.10 Yosemite	10.10.2	—N/a	—N/a
10.11 El Capitan	Yes	10.11.4	—N/a
10.12 Sierra	Yes	Yes	10.12.5
10.13 High Sierra	Yes	Yes	Yes
10.14 Mojave	Yes	Yes	Yes
10.15 Catalina	Yes	Yes	Yes
11 Big Sur	Yes	Yes	Yes
12 Monterey	Patch	Yes	Yes
13 Ventura	Patch	Patch	Yes
14 Sonoma	Patch	Patch	Patch
15 Sequoia	Patch	Patch	Patch
26 Tahoe	Patch	Patch	Patch
27 Golden Gate	No	No	No

=== Windows releases ===
Windows version	Model	
Windows version	Early 2015-Early 2016	2017
Windows 8 (Note: Windows 8 can only be installed on Macs with Boot Camp 5.0 to 6.0. This includes OS X 10.11 and earlier.) (Note: Only 64-bit versions of Windows are supported for Windows 8 and later.)	Yes	No
Windows 8.1 (Note: Windows 8.1 can only be installed on Macs with Boot Camp 5.1 or later, running macOS High Sierra or earlier. Later versions of macOS no longer support Windows 8.1.)	Yes	No
Windows 10 (Note: Windows 10 can only be installed on Macs with Boot Camp 6.0 or later. It is the only supported version of Windows on macOS Mojave and later.)	Yes	Yes
Windows 11	Unofficial	Unofficial

== Timeline ==
Timeline of portable Macintoshes
See also: List of Mac models

== See also ==
- MacBook Air
- MacBook Neo
- MacBook Pro

== Notes ==
Preceded by MacBook	MacBook (12-inch); April 10, 2015	Succeeded by MacBook Neo
