= IBooks =

iBooks may refer to:

- iBooks, the former name of Apple Books
- ibooks Inc., a book and comics publishing company founded by Byron Preiss

== See also ==
- iBook, a defunct series of laptops by Apple
