= MacBook (2006–2012) =

Line of notebook computers by Apple

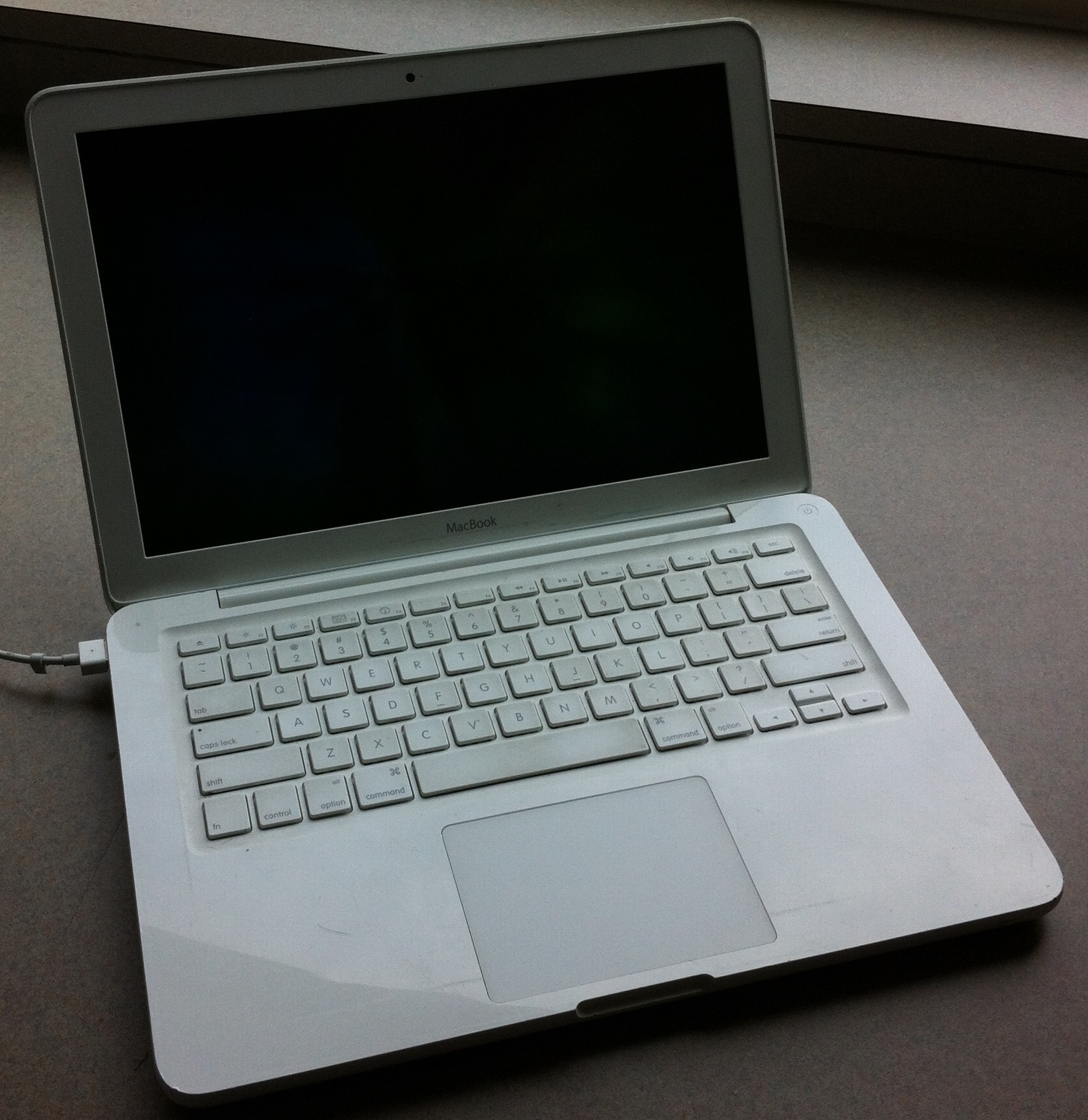
- A 2009 model MacBook
- Developer: Apple
- Product family: MacBook
- Type: Subnotebook
- Released: May 16, 2006; 20 years ago
- Operating system: macOS
- CPU: Intel Core Duo; Intel Core 2 Duo
- Display: 13.3 in (340 mm) widescreen LCD, 1280 × 800 pixel resolution
- Predecessor: iBook
- Successor: 12-inch MacBook; MacBook Air
- Related: 12-inch MacBook; MacBook Pro; MacBook Neo

The MacBook is a line of Mac laptops sold by Apple between May 2006 and February 2012. It replaced the iBook series of notebooks as a part of Apple's transition from PowerPC to Intel processors. Positioned as the low end of the MacBook family, below the premium ultra-portable MacBook Air and the performance-oriented MacBook Pro, the MacBook was aimed at the consumer and education markets. It became the best-selling Mac in Apple's history. For five months in 2008, it was the best-selling laptop of any brand in US retail stores.

There have been three separate designs of the original MacBook. The original design used a combination of polycarbonate and fiberglass casing which was modeled after the iBook G4. The second design, introduced in October 2008 alongside the 15 in (380 mm) MacBook Pro, shared the latter's unibody aluminium casing, but lacked a FireWire port. A third design, introduced in late 2009, retained a similar unibody construction but lacked a FireWire port and changed back to white polycarbonate.

On July 20, 2011, the MacBook was discontinued for consumer purchase, as it had been effectively superseded by the MacBook Air, which had a lower entry price. Apple continued to sell the MacBook to educational institutions until February 2012. A new line of computers by the same name was released in 2015, serving the same purpose as an entry-level laptop.

== Polycarbonate (2006–2009) ==
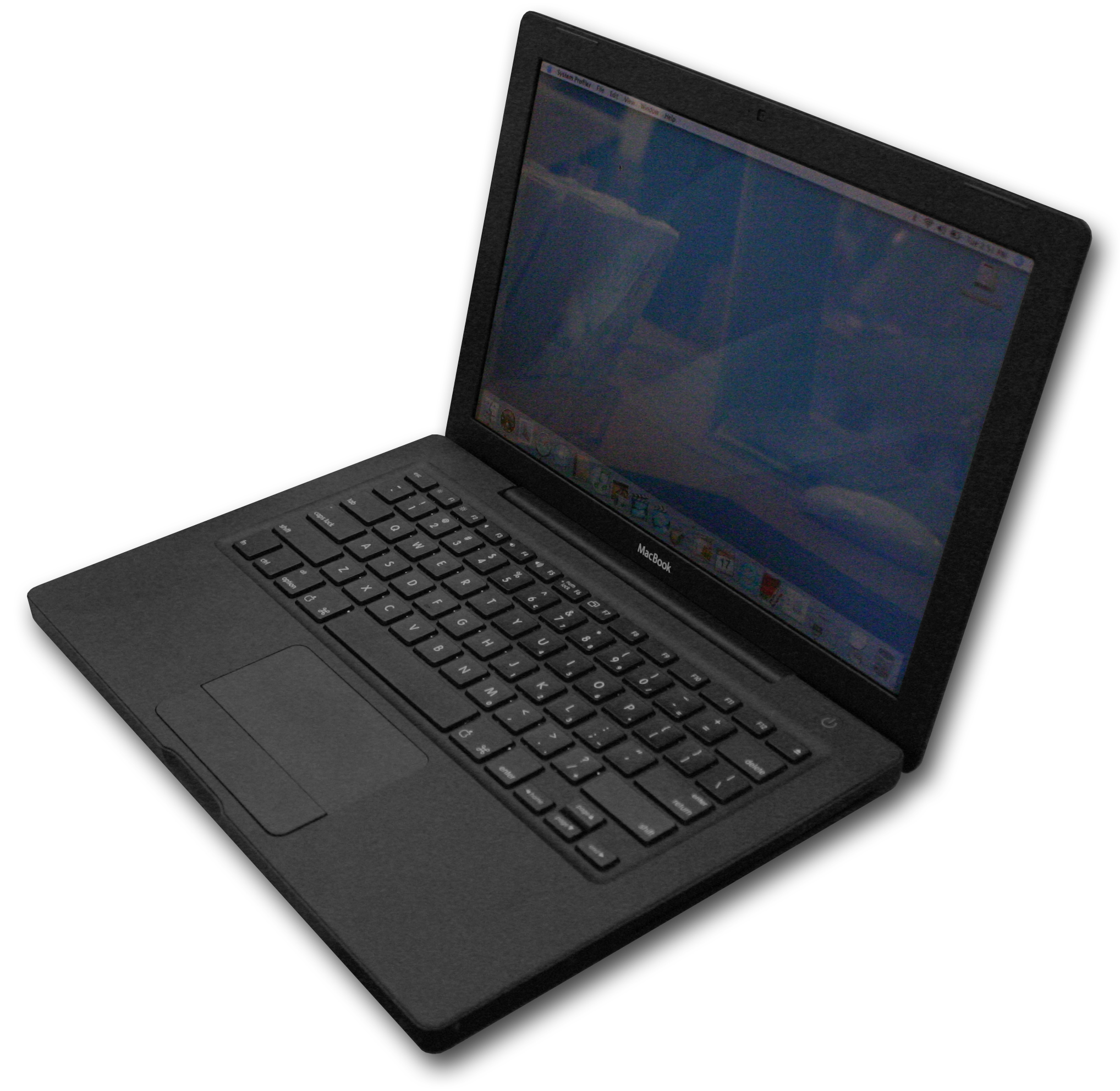
Black polycarbonate MacBook (early 2006)

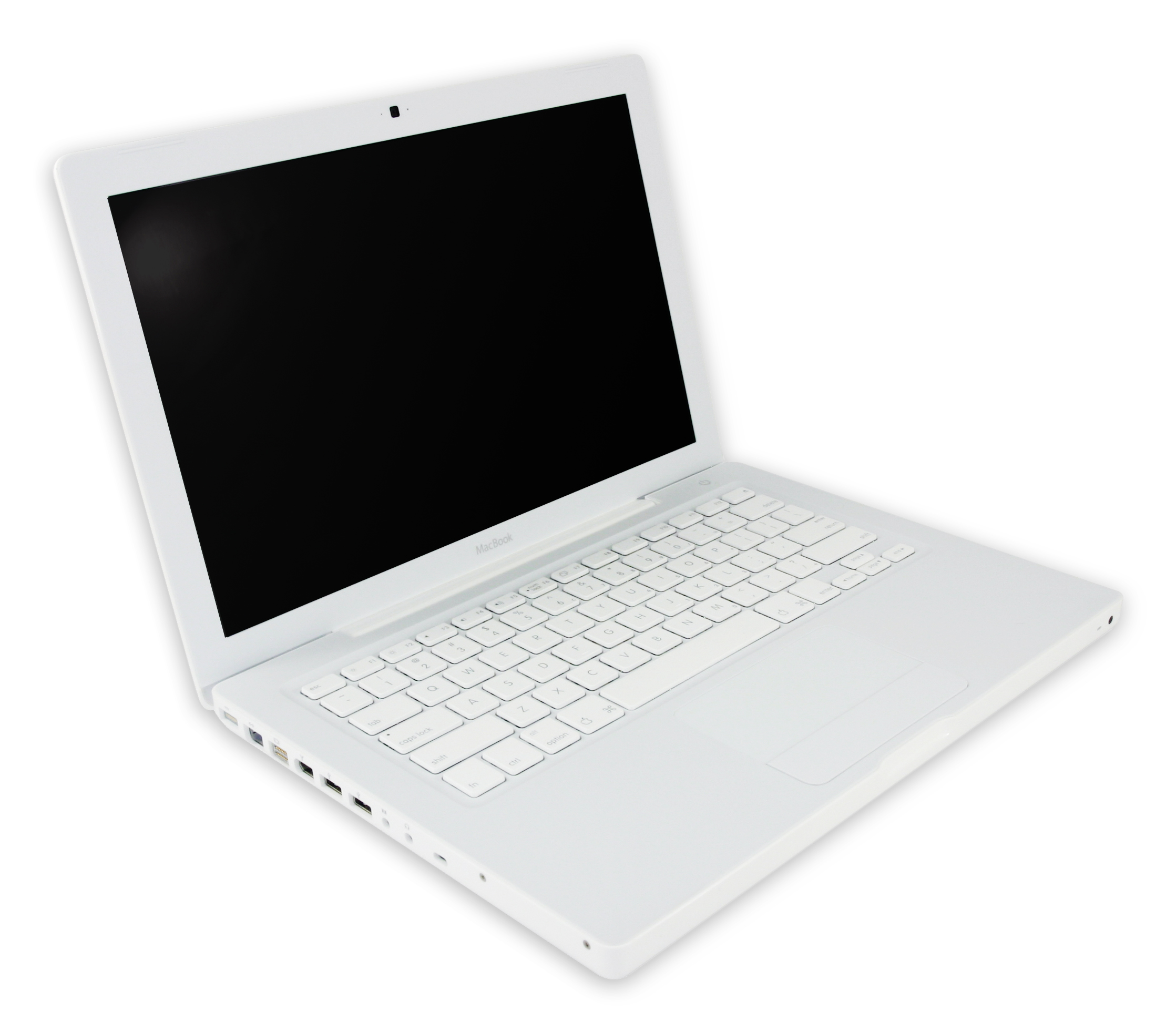
White polycarbonate MacBook (early 2006)

The original MacBook, available in black or white colors, was released on May 16, 2006, and used the 32-bit Intel Core Duo processor and 945GM chipset, with Intel's GMA 950 integrated graphics on a 667 MHz front side bus. Later revisions of the MacBook moved to the 64-bit Core 2 Duo processor and the GM965 chipset, with Intel's GMA X3100 integrated graphics on an 800 MHz system bus. Sales of the black polycarbonate MacBook ceased in October 2008, after the introduction of the aluminum MacBook, however the white model continued to be sold until the introduction of the redesigned unibody polycarbonate MacBook.

The MacBook is thinner than its predecessor, the iBook G4, but it is wider than the 12 in (300 mm) model, and has a widescreen display. The MacBook was one of Apple's first laptops to adopt the MagSafe power connector (the first being the MacBook Pro), and it replaced the iBook's mini-VGA display port with a mini-DVI display port. The iBook's discrete graphics chip was initially replaced by an integrated Intel GMA solution, though the latest revisions of the MacBook were upgraded with the more powerful Nvidia GeForce 9400M and later the 320M.

The MacBook was Apple's first notebook to use features now standard in its notebooks – the glossy display, the sunken keyboard design and the non-mechanical magnetic latch. With the late 2007 revision, the keyboard received several changes to closely mirror the one which shipped with the iMac, by adding the same keyboard shortcuts to control multimedia, and removing the embedded numeric keypad and the Apple logo from the command keys.

A more expensive black model, with a larger capacity hard drive, was offered until the introduction of the unibody aluminum MacBook. The polycarbonate MacBook was the only Macintosh notebook (until the new 2015 model) to be offered in more than one color since the iBook G3 (Clamshell). The black MacBook was Apple's second black notebook, after the PowerBook G3.

=== Ports ===
The ports are all on the left edge; on early models, from left to right, they are the MagSafe power connector, Gigabit Ethernet, mini-DVI, FireWire 400, 2 USB 2.0 ports, audio in, audio out and Kensington Security Slot.

For the unibody polycarbonate MacBook (2009), the ports from left to right are the MagSafe power connector, Gigabit Ethernet, Mini DisplayPort, 2 USB 2.0 ports, audio out and Kensington Security Slot.

On the front, there is a power light and an infrared receiver, while on the right edge, there is only the optical drive.

=== User serviceability ===
The polycarbonate Intel MacBook is easier for users to fix or upgrade than its predecessor. Where the iBook required substantial disassembly to access internal components such as the internal hard drive, the Macbook requires that users only remove the battery and the RAM door to access or replace the hard drive. Apple has provided do-it-yourself manuals for these tasks on the Apple website.

=== Quality problems ===
Some early polycarbonate MacBook models suffered from random shutdowns; Apple released a firmware update to resolve them. There were cases reported of discolored or chipping palmrests. In such cases, Apple asked affected owners to contact AppleCare.

=== Technical specifications ===
Apple used the A1181 code, printed on the case, for the 1st generation polycarbonate family of models, though 17 variations may be counted if color is included.

According to Apple, all of these models are obsolete. (Note: Apple products that have been discontinued for 7 years and no longer receive hardware support or spare parts)

Model		Original			Late 2006			Mid 2007		Late 2007		Early 2008		Late 2008	Early 2009	Mid 2009
Timeline	Released	May 16, 2006			November 8, 2006			May 15, 2007		November 1, 2007		February 26, 2008		October 14, 2008	January 21, 2009	May 27, 2009
Timeline	Discontinued	November 8, 2006			May 15, 2007			November 1, 2007		February 26, 2008		October 14, 2008	January 20, 2009	June 8, 2009	May 27, 2009	October 20, 2009
Timeline	Vintage	[data missing]														
Timeline	Obsolete	[data missing]														
Apple Order numbers (and color)		MA254 (White)	MA255 (White)	MA472 (Black)	MA699 (White)	MA700 (White)	MA701 (Black)	MB061 (White)	MB062 (White), MB063 (Black)	MB061 (White)	MB062 (White), MB063 (Black)	MB403 (White), MB404 (Black)	MB402/A (White)	MB402/B (White)	MB881 (White)	MC240 (White)
Model identifier		MacBook1,1			MacBook2,1					MacBook3,1		MacBook4,1			MacBook5,2	
Display		13.3 in (340 mm) glossy widescreen LCD, 1280 × 800 pixel resolution (WXGA, 16:10 = 8:5 aspect ratio), TN 6-bit color panel														
Performance	Processor	Yonah Intel Core Duo (T2400)	Yonah Intel Core Duo (T2500)		Merom Intel Core 2 Duo (T5600)	Merom Intel Core 2 Duo (T7200)			Merom Intel Core 2 Duo (T7400)	Merom Intel Core 2 Duo (T7300)	Merom Intel Core 2 Duo (T7500)	Penryn-3M Intel Core 2 Duo (T8300)	Penryn-3M Intel Core 2 Duo (T8100)		Penryn-3M Intel Core 2 Duo (P7350)	Penryn-3M Intel Core 2 Duo (P7450)
Performance	Clock speed	1.83 GHz	2 GHz		1.83 GHz	2 GHz			2.16 GHz	2 GHz	2.2 GHz	2.4 GHz	2.1 GHz		2 GHz	2.13 GHz
Performance	Front side bus	667 MHz								800 MHz					1066 MHz	
Performance	Memory Two slots for DDR2 SDRAM	512 MB (two 256 MB) 667 MHz PC2-5300 Expandable to 2 GB			512 MB (two 256 MB) 667 MHz PC2-5300 Expandable to 4 GB (3 GB usable) (Note: Expandable to 4 GB, with 3.3 GB usable)	1 GB (two 512 MB) 667 MHz PC2-5300 Expandable to 4 GB (3 GB usable)				1 GB (two 512 MB) 667 MHz PC2-5300 Expandable to 6 GB (4 GB supported by Apple)		1 GB (two 512 MB) or 2 GB (two 1 GB) 667 MHz PC2-5300 Expandable to 6 GB (4 GB supported by Apple)		1 GB (two 512 MB) 667 MHz PC2-5300 Expandable to 6 GB (4 GB supported by Apple)	2 GB (two 1 GB) 667 MHz PC2-5300 Expandable to 8 GB 800 MHz PC2-6400 (4 GB supported by Apple) (Note: Expandable to 8 GB, but with only 6 GB working stably with a Mac OS X older than 10.6.6 due to a software bug)	2 GB (two 1 GB) 800 MHz PC2-6400 Expandable to 8 GB (4 GB supported by Apple)
Performance	Graphics Shared with system memory	Intel GMA 950 using 64 MB RAM (up to 224 MB in Windows through Boot Camp).								Intel GMA X3100 using 144 MB RAM (up to 384 MB available in Windows through Boot Camp)					Nvidia GeForce 9400M using 256 MB RAM	
Storage	Hard drive (Note: Hard drives noted are options available from Apple. As the hard drive is a user-replaceable part, there are custom configurations available, including use of 7200-rpm drives or SSDs.)	60 GB Optional 100 or 120 GB		80 GB Optional 100 or 120 GB	60 GB Optional 160 or 200 GB, 4200-rpm	80 GB Optional 160 GB, 4200-rpm	120 GB Optional 200 GB, 4200-rpm	80 GB Optional 200 GB, 4200-rpm	120 GB (MB062), 160 GB (MB063) Optional 200 GB, 4200-rpm	80 GB Optional 250 GB	120 GB (MB062), 160 GB (MB063) Optional 250 GB	160 GB (MB404), 250 GB (MB402)	120 GB	120 GB Optional 160 or 250 GB	120 GB Optional 160, 250, 320 GB	160 GB Optional 250, 320, 500 GB
Storage	Hard drive	Serial ATA 5400-rpm unless specified														
Storage	Optical drive (Slot-loading)	Combo drive (DVD-ROM/CD-RW)	SuperDrive (DVD±RW/CD-RW)		Combo drive (DVD-ROM/CD-RW)	SuperDrive (DVD±RW/CD-RW)		Combo drive (DVD-ROM/CD-RW)	SuperDrive (DVD±RW/CD-RW)	Combo drive (DVD-ROM/CD-RW)	SuperDrive (DVD±RW/CD-RW)		Combo drive (DVD-ROM/CD-RW)	SuperDrive (DVD±RW/CD-RW)		
Connectivity		Integrated AirPort Extreme 802.11a/b/g Gigabit Ethernet; Bluetooth 2.0 + EDR			Integrated Airport Extreme 802.11a/b/g/n (draft-n disabled by default) (Note: Requires the purchase of a wireless-N enabler software from Apple in order to enable the functionality. Also enabled in Mac OS X 10.6 and later.); Gigabit Ethernet; Bluetooth 2.0 + EDR		Integrated Airport Extreme 802.11a/b/g/n (draft-n enabled); Gigabit Ethernet; Bluetooth 2.0 + EDR								Integrated Airport Extreme 802.11a/b/g/n (draft-n enabled); Gigabit Ethernet; Bluetooth 2.1 + EDR	
Peripherals		2 × USB 2.0; 1 × Firewire 400; 1 × Optical digital / analog audio line-in 1 × Optical digital / analog audio line-out														
Camera		iSight Camera (640 × 480 0.3 MP)														
Video out		Mini DVI-I (integrated digital + analog)													Mini DVI-I (integrated digital + analog; composite and S-video output no longer supported)	
Operating system	Original	Mac OS X 10.4 Tiger								Mac OS X 10.5 Leopard						
Operating system	Latest release	Mac OS X 10.6.8 Snow Leopard (If only 512 MB RAM are installed, then only 10.5.8)			Mac OS X 10.7.5 Lion (If only 512 MB or 1 GB RAM are or is installed, then only 10.5.8 or 10.6.8 respectively)	Mac OS X 10.7.5 Lion (If only 1 GB RAM is installed, then only 10.6.8)									OS X 10.11 El Capitan	
Battery		55-watt-hour removable lithium-polymer														
Dimensions	Weight	5.2 lb (2.4 kg)						5.1 lb (2.3 kg)	5.0 lb (2.3 kg)							
Dimensions	Volume	1.08 in × 12.78 in × 8.92 in (27.5 mm × 325 mm × 227 mm)														

== Aluminum unibody (2008) ==
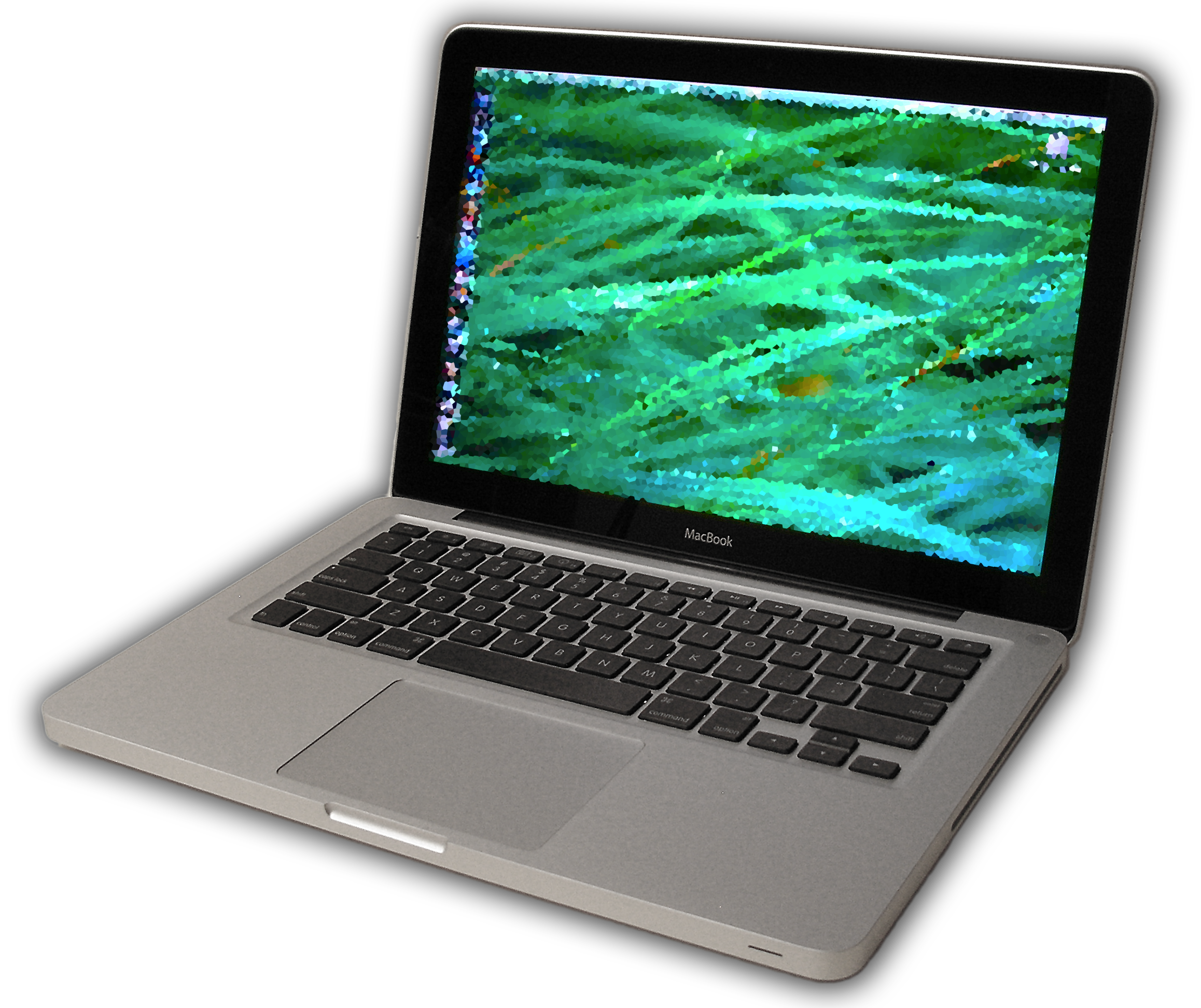
The aluminum unibody MacBook

On October 14, 2008, Apple announced a MacBook featuring a new Nvidia chipset at a Cupertino, California press conference with the tagline: "The spotlight turns to notebooks". It was replaced by the 13 in (330 mm) MacBook Pro the following year.

The chipset brought a 1066 MHz system bus, use of DDR3 system memory, and integrated Nvidia GeForce 9400M graphics. Other changes include a display which uses LED backlights (replacing the fluorescent tube backlights used in the previous model) and arsenic-free glass, a new Mini DisplayPort (replacing the polycarbonate MacBook's mini-DVI port), a multi-touch glass trackpad which also acts as the mouse button, and the removal of the FireWire 400 port (thus this model doesn't support Target Disk Mode, used for data transfers or operating system repairs without booting the system).

There was only one product cycle of the aluminum MacBook, as Apple rebranded the next revision in June 2009 as a 13 in (330 mm) MacBook Pro using the same chassis with an added FireWire port and SD card slot.

=== Design ===
The design of the unibody MacBook has stylistic traits of the MacBook Air that were also implemented into the design of the unibody MacBook Pro. This model is thinner than the original polycarbonate MacBooks, and it made use of a unibody aluminum case with tapered edges. The keyboard of the higher-end model included a backlight.

=== Reception ===
Although Gizmodo concluded it to be "our favorite MacBook to date," they did claim, at this time, its display was inferior to that found on the MacBook Pro and MacBook Air, alleging a smaller viewing angle, washed-out colors, and dimmer backlighting. Similarly, AppleInsider and Engadget concluded it "may well be Apple's best MacBook to date" and "these are terrific choices—not only from an industrial design standpoint, but in specs as well" respectively, while also drawing attention to a lower quality display as compared with the MacBook Pro and MacBook Air. Charlie Sorrel of Wired News reached a similar conclusion about the MacBook display, citing its poor contrast and lack of vertical angle in comparison with the MacBook Pro and even the older white MacBook. Peter Cohen wrote an article discussing the loss of the FireWire port for Macworld, saying "The absence of FireWire ports is certainly an inconvenience for some users. But it shouldn’t be considered a deal-breaker for most of us, anyway."

=== Technical specifications ===
According to Apple, all of these models are obsolete.

Model		Late 2008	
Timeline	Released	October 14, 2008	
Timeline	Discontinued	June 8, 2009	
Timeline	Vintage	September 8, 2014	
Timeline	Obsolete	September 13, 2016	
Production	Models	A1278 (EMC 2254)	
Production	Model numbers	MB466	MB467
Production	Model identifier	MacBook5,1	
Performance	Front side bus	1066 MHz	
Performance	Processor	Penryn-3M Intel Core 2 Duo (P7350)	Penryn-3M Intel Core 2 Duo (P8600)
Performance	Clock speed	2.0 GHz	2.4 GHz
Performance	Memory	2 GB (two 1 GB); Expandable to 8 GB (4 GB supported by Apple); Two slots for PC3-8500 DDR3 SDRAM (1066 MHz)	
Performance	Graphics	Integrated Nvidia GeForce 9400M with 256 MB shared with main memory (up to 512 MB available in Windows through Boot Camp)	
Display	Screen	13.3 in (340 mm) LED backlit glossy widescreen LCD, 1280 × 800 pixel resolution	
Display	Video out	Mini DisplayPort	
Storage	Hard drive (Note: Hard drives noted are options available from Apple. As the hard drive is a user-replaceable part, there are custom configurations available, including use of 7,200-rpm drives and SSDs.)	160 GB 5400-rpm Serial ATA; Optional 320 GB HDD; 128 GB or 256 GB Solid-state drive	250 GB 5400-rpm Serial ATA; Optional 320 GB HDD; 128 GB or 256 GB Solid-state drive
Storage	Optical drive	Internal slot-loading SuperDrive Maximum write: (Note: Given optical drive speed is its maximum) 8× DVD±R, 4× DVD±R DL, 4× DVD±RW, 24× CD-R, 10× CD-RW; Maximum read: 8× DVD±R, DVD-ROM, 6× DVD-ROM (double layer DVD-9), DVD±R DL, DVD±RW, 24× CD	
Connectivity	Networking	Integrated AirPort Extreme 802.11a/b/g/draft-n (BCM4322 chipset); Gigabit Ethernet; Bluetooth 2.1 + EDR	
Connectivity	Peripherals	2 × USB 2.0; 1 × Combined optical digital input/analog line in 1 × Combined optical digital output/analog line out	
Battery		45-watt-hour removable lithium polymer	
Dimensions	Weight	4.5 lb (2.0 kg)	
Dimensions	Volume	12.78 in (325 mm) wide × 8.94 in (227 mm) deep × 0.95 inches (24 mm) high	
OS	Original	Mac OS X 10.5 Leopard	
OS	Latest	OS X 10.11 El Capitan (Unofficially, able to go to macOS Sequoia by using a third party OS patcher)	

== Polycarbonate unibody (2009–2010) ==
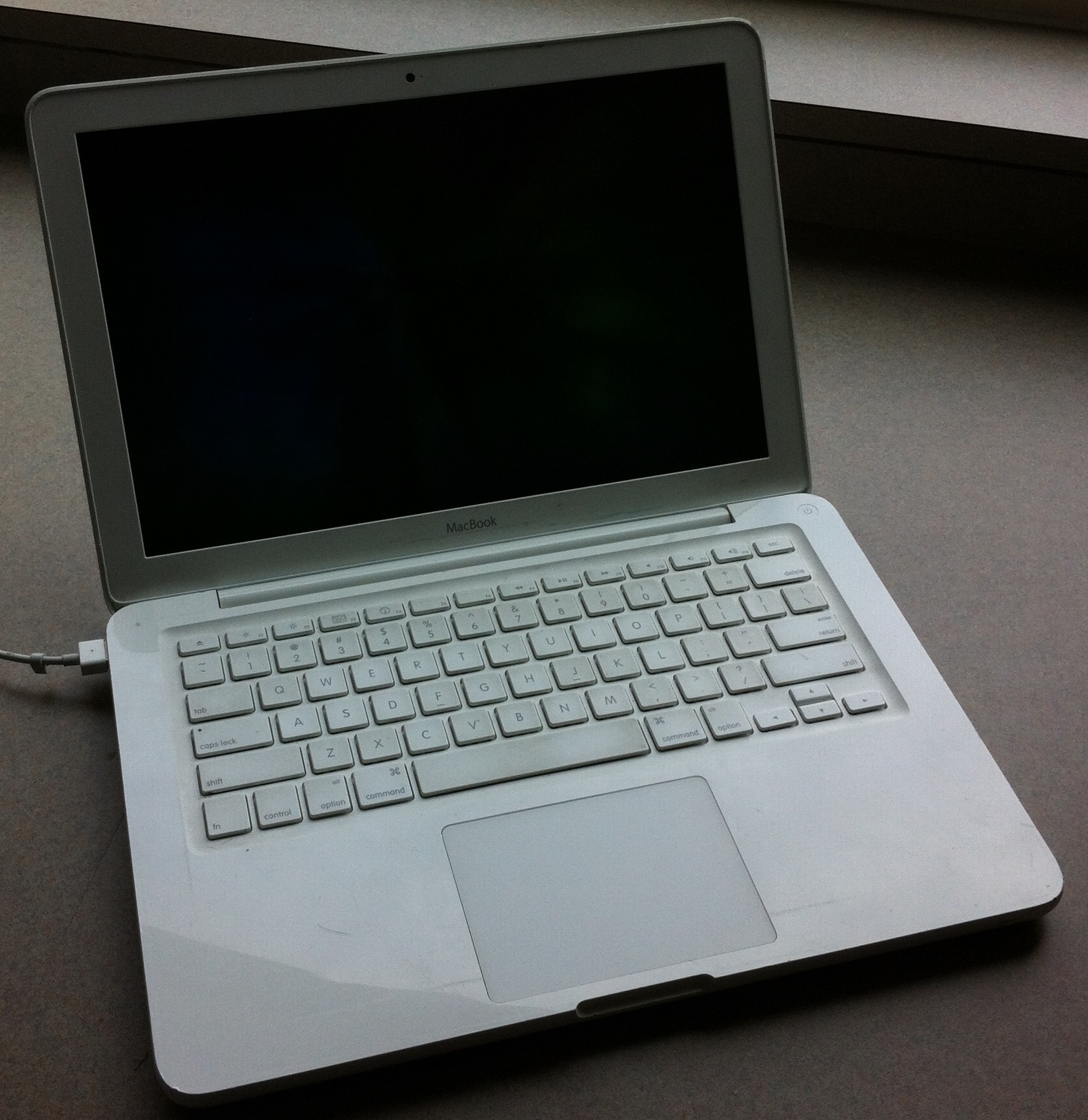
Redesigned polycarbonate unibody MacBook

On October 20, 2009, Apple released a MacBook that had a new and more rounded polycarbonate (plastic) unibody design, faster DDR3 memory, a multi-touch trackpad, an LED-backlit display, and a built-in seven-hour battery. The polycarbonate unibody MacBook, like its aluminum predecessor, lacks FireWire and, like the 13 in (330 mm) MacBook Pro, has a combined audio in/out port. There is no infrared port and the Apple Remote was not included.

On May 18, 2010, the MacBook was refreshed with a faster processor, a faster graphics card, improved battery life, and the ability to pass audio through the Mini DisplayPort connector. On July 20, 2011, the MacBook was discontinued for consumer purchases, but was still available to educational institutions until February 2012. It was the last Mac to use a plastic shell, as every Mac since has used aluminum.

=== Design ===
The polycarbonate unibody MacBook is rounder on the edges than previous laptops in the MacBook line. This model has an all-white fingerprint-resistant glossy palm rest, unlike the grayish surface of its predecessor, and uses a multi-touch glass trackpad like the one found on the MacBook Pro. The video-out port is Mini DisplayPort. The bottom of the MacBook features a rubberized non-slip finish. This was prone to peeling off and Apple offered free replacements fitted by authorised agents until at least 2015 internationally. The built-in battery of the late 2009 revision, a feature introduced earlier in the year with the MacBook Pro, is claimed by Apple to last seven hours compared with five hours in the older models. However, in tests conducted by Macworld, the battery was found to last only about four hours while playing video at full brightness with AirPort turned off. However, Apple's battery life was calculated with the brightness at the middle setting and while browsing websites and editing word documents, not with video and at full brightness. Gizmodo also reached about the same conclusion in their tests, but with AirPort turned on. The battery included in the mid-2010 model holds an additional five watt-hours over the previous model's and is claimed to last up to ten hours.

=== Reception ===
Slashgear praised the polycarbonate unibody MacBook as "one of the best entry-level notebooks Apple have produced", but criticized it for its lack of a FireWire port and SD card slot. Nilay Patel of Engadget added that the USB ports were easily dented and the bottom of the laptop became worn and discolored after a few days. He also drew particular attention to the fact that the price was not lowered, stating the small price difference between the MacBook and the MacBook Pro makes it a "wasted pricing opportunity." However, most critics agree that the unibody MacBook's display is significantly better than its predecessor's. AppleInsider states the new display "delivers significantly better color and viewing angle performance" than the previous MacBook, but still "not as vivid and wide-angle viewable as the MacBook Pro screens."

=== Technical specifications ===
According to Apple, all of these models are obsolete.

Model		Late 2009	Mid 2010
Timeline	Announced	[data missing]	[data missing]
Timeline	Released	October 20, 2009	May 18, 2010
Timeline	Discontinued	May 18, 2010 (May 16, 2011 to the education channel)	July 20, 2011 (February 8, 2012 to the education channel)
Timeline	Vintage	Yes	Yes
Timeline	Obsolete	Yes	Yes
Production	Order Numbers	MC207	MC516
Production	Model Numbers	A1342	
Production	Machine Model	MacBook6,1 & EMC 2350	MacBook7,1 & EMC 2395
Display		13.3 in (340 mm) LED backlit glossy widescreen LCD, 1280 × 800 pixel resolution	
Performance	Front side bus	1066 MHz	
Performance	Processor	Intel Penryn-3M Core 2 Duo (P7550)	Intel Penryn-3M Core 2 Duo (P8600)
Performance	Clock speed	2.26 GHz	2.4 GHz
Performance	Memory (Note: Memory noted are the options available from Apple. As memory is a user-replaceable part, there are custom configurations possible, including use of two 2 GB RAM modules, for 4 GB of RAM, two 4 GB RAM modules, for 8 GB of RAM, and two 8 GB RAM modules, for 16 GB of RAM. Modules must be PC3-8500S, CL 7, 1.5 volts. Also possible: 2 + 1 = 3 GB; 4 + 1 = 5 GB; 8 + 1 = 9 GB; 4 + 2 = 6 GB; 8 + 2 = 10 GB; 8 + 4 = 12 GB. Modules may be 1Rx8 or 2Rx8.)	Two slots for PC3-8500 DDR3 SDRAM (1066 MHz); 2 GB (two 1 GB)	
Performance	Memory	Expandable to 8 GB (4 GB supported by Apple)	Expandable to 16 GB (4 GB supported by Apple)
Performance	Graphics	Integrated Nvidia GeForce 9400M with 256 MB shared with main memory (up to 512 MB available in Windows through Boot Camp)	Integrated Nvidia GeForce 320M with 256 MB shared with main memory
Storage	Hard drive (Note: Hard drives noted are options available from Apple. As the hard drive is a user-replaceable part, there are custom configurations possible, including capacities up to 2 TB and SSDs. For rotating drives, 5,400 rpm is recommended, for power and cooling reasons.)	Serial ATA 250 GB 5400-rpm Optional 320 or 500 GB	
Storage	SuperDrive (Note: Noted optical drive speed is its maximum. It is possible to replace the optical drive with a caddy which accommodates an SSD or a second hard drive. Look for caddies which are intended for MacBook A1342 models; there are similar (but slightly different) caddies which are intended for Mac Mini models.)	Internal Slot-Loading; Maximum write: 8× DVD±R, 4× DVD±R DL, 4× DVD±RW, 24× CD-R, 10× CD-RW; Maximum read: 8× DVD±R, DVD-ROM, 6× DVD-ROM (double layer DVD-9), DVD±R DL, DVD±RW, 24× CD	
Connectivity		Integrated AirPort 802.11a/b/g/n (BCM43224 chipset); Gigabit Ethernet; Bluetooth 2.1 + EDR	
Peripherals		2 × USB 2.0; 1 × Optical digital audio out / analog audio line-out/in	
Camera		iSight Camera (640 × 480 0.3 MP)	
Video out		Mini DisplayPort; Video only	Mini DisplayPort with Audio-out
Operating system	Original	Mac OS X 10.6 Snow Leopard	
Operating system	Latest	macOS 10.13 High Sierra (Unofficially, able to go to macOS Sequoia by using a third party OS patcher)	
Battery		60-watt-hour non-removable lithium-polymer	63.5-watt-hour non-removable lithium-polymer
Dimensions	Weight	4.7 lb (2.1 kg)	
Dimensions	Volume	1.09 in × 13.00 in × 9.12 in (27.4 mm × 330.3 mm × 231.7 mm)	

== Criticisms and defects ==
The rubber bottom of unibody MacBooks have been known to peel off. Apple has noticed this as a flaw and will replace the bottom for free, with or without a warranty. Some consumers have also reported defects in their LCD displays in mid-2010–2011 models.

The MagSafe power adapter of MacBooks has been known to fray, break, and stop working. Following a lawsuit, Apple replaces these adapters for US residents with affected adapters, purchased (or received as a gift) with computers or as an accessory.

Some MacBooks are affected by the iSeeYou vulnerability, potentially allowing their iSight cameras to record the user without the user's knowledge.

== Supported operating systems ==
Supported macOS releases
macOS release	Original	Late 2006	Mid 2007	Late 2007	Early 2008	Late 2008 (White)	Late 2008 (Aluminum)	Early 2009	Mid 2009	Late 2009	Mid 2010
10.4 Tiger	10.4.6	10.4.8	10.4.9	Partial (Note: Requires at least 10.4.9 due to 64-bit EFI. No graphics acceleration are available for the GMA X3100.)			—N/a	—N/a	—N/a	—N/a	—N/a
10.5 Leopard	Yes	Yes	Yes	Yes	10.5.2	10.5.4	10.5.5	10.5.6	10.5.7	Partial (Note: Screen brightness control and audio input/output will not work. Display color profile and some trackpad settings will also be unavailable. Screenshots will not be rendered properly, causing image corruption.)	Partial, Patch (Note: NVDAResman.kext needs to be deleted. Graphics acceleration and audio input/output will not work. Display color profile, display brightness and some trackpad settings will also be unavailable.)
10.6 Snow Leopard	With 1 GB RAM		Yes	Yes	Yes	Yes	Yes	Yes	Yes	10.6.1	10.6.3
10.7 Lion	Patch, With 2 GB RAM (Note: Requires system files patching. Up to 10.7.3 or 10.7.5 with no Wi-Fi.)	With 2 GB RAM					Yes	Yes	Yes	Yes	Yes
10.8 Mountain Lion	No	Patch, With 2 GB RAM					Yes	Yes	Yes	Yes	Yes
10.9 Mavericks	No	Patch, With 2 GB RAM (Note: There are no graphics drivers available for the GMA 950 after OS X Mountain Lion.)		Patch, With 2 GB RAM (Note: There are currently no graphics drivers available for the GMA X3100 after OS X Mountain Lion until macOS Big Sur.)			Yes	Yes	Yes	Yes	Yes
10.10 Yosemite	No	Patch, With 2 GB RAM		Patch, With 2 GB RAM			Yes	Yes	Yes	Yes	Yes
10.11 El Capitan	No	Patch, With 2 GB RAM		Patch, With 2 GB RAM			Yes	Yes	Yes	Yes	Yes
10.12 Sierra	No	No	No	No	Patch, With 2 GB RAM		Patch			Yes	Yes
10.13 High Sierra	No	No	No	No	Patch, With 2 GB RAM		Patch			Yes	Yes
10.14 Mojave	No	No	No	No	Patch, With 2 GB RAM		Patch				
10.15 Catalina	No	No	No	No	Patch, With 4 GB RAM		Patch, With 4 GB RAM				
11 Big Sur	No	No	No	No	Patch, With 4 GB RAM		Patch, With 4 GB RAM				
12 Monterey	No	No	No	No	Patch, With 4 GB RAM		Patch, With 4 GB RAM				
13 Ventura	No	No	No	No	Patch, With 4 GB RAM		Patch, With 4 GB RAM				
14 Sonoma	No	No	No	No	Patch, With 4 GB RAM		Patch, With 4 GB RAM				
15 Sequoia	No	No	No	No	Patch, With 4 GB RAM		Patch, With 4 GB RAM				
26 Tahoe	No	No	No	No	Patch, With 4 GB RAM		Patch, With 4 GB RAM				

Supported Windows versions
Windows version		Original	Late 2006-Mid 2009	Late 2009-Mid 2010
Windows 2000 (Note: This version of Windows is not supported on these Macs however, these can still be unofficially installed.)		Unofficial	Unofficial	Unofficial
Windows XP (Note: Windows XP can only be installed on Macs with Boot Camp 3 or earlier. This includes Mac OS X 10.6 or earlier and copies of Mac OS X 10.7 that have not been updated to Boot Camp 4.)		Yes	Yes	Yes
Windows Vista	32-bit (Note: Windows Vista can only be installed on Macs with Boot Camp 3 or earlier. This includes Mac OS X 10.6 or earlier and copies of Mac OS X 10.7 that have not been updated to Boot Camp 4.)	Yes	Yes	Yes
Windows Vista	64-bit	No	Unofficial	Yes
Windows 7	32-bit (Note: The 32-bit version of Windows 7 can only be installed on Macs with Boot Camp 3.1 to 6.0. This includes OS X 10.11 and earlier.)	Unofficial	Yes	Yes
Windows 7	64-bit (Note: The 64-bit version of Windows 7 can only be installed on Macs with Boot Camp 3.1 or later, running macOS High Sierra or earlier. Later versions of macOS no longer support Windows 7.)	No	Unofficial	Yes
Windows 8 (Note: This version of Windows is not supported with Boot Camp on these Macs. Later versions of Windows can be installed via Windows in-place upgrade.)		Unofficial, 32bit only	Unofficial	Unofficial
Windows 10		Unofficial, 32bit only	Unofficial	Unofficial
Windows 11		No	Unofficial, Patch	Unofficial, Patch

== Timeline ==
Timeline of portable Macintoshes
See also: List of Mac models

== See also ==
- MacBook
- MacBook (2015–2019)
- MacBook Air
- MacBook Pro

== Notes ==
Preceded by iBook G4	MacBook; May 16, 2006	Succeeded by MacBook (2015–2019)
