= IBook =

Series of laptops by Apple Computer

iBook

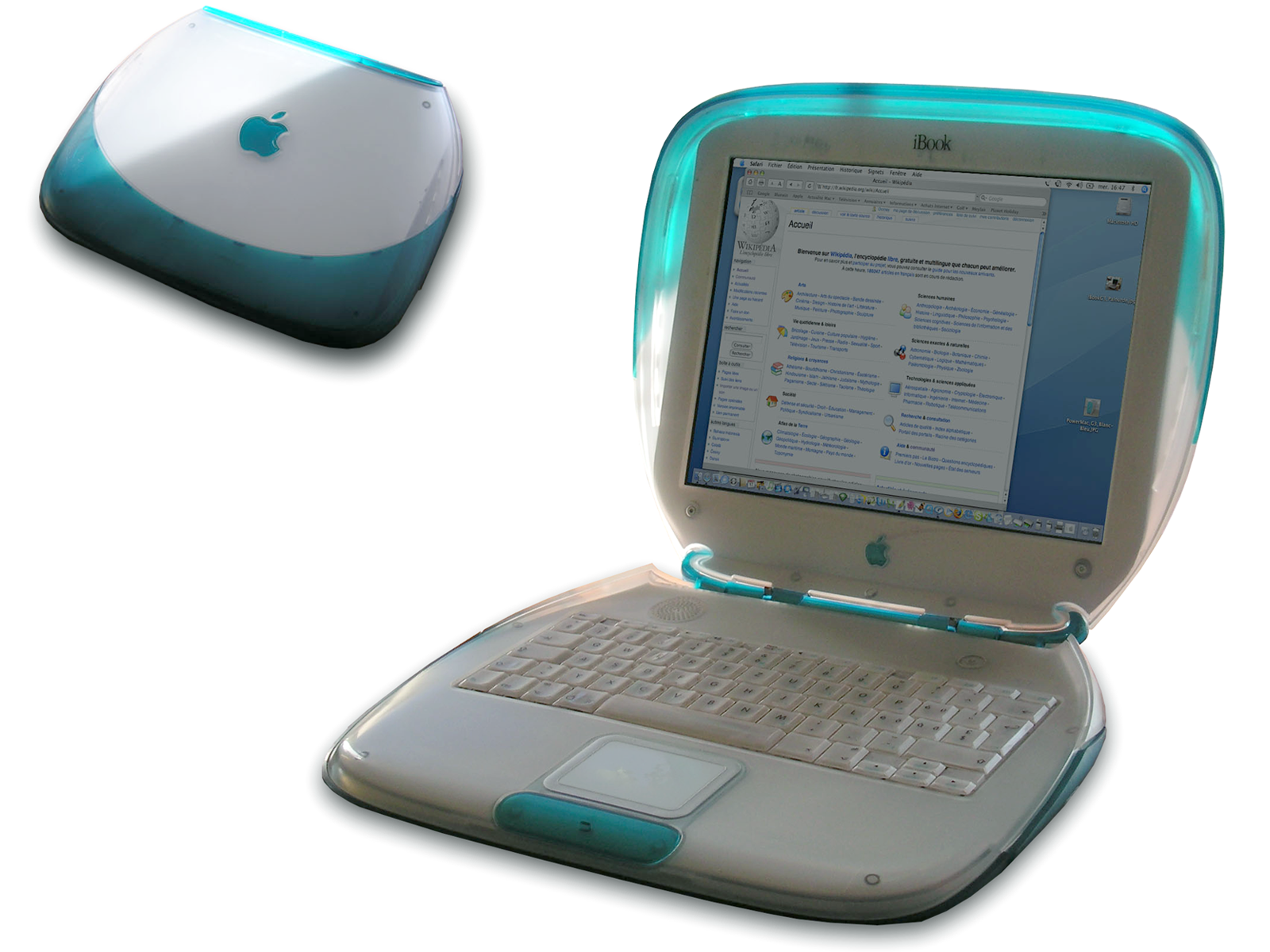
- The first-generation iBook G3 "Clamshell" in Blueberry color opened and closed
- Developer: Apple Computer
- Product family: Mac
- Type: Laptop
- Released: July 21, 1999
- Discontinued: May 16, 2006
- Operating system: Mac OS
- CPU: PowerPC
- Display: TFT LCD
- Successor: MacBook
- Related: PowerBook, iMac
- Website: www.apple.com/ibook/ at the Wayback Machine (archived October 1, 1999)

The iBook is a line of laptop computers designed, manufactured, and sold by Apple Computer from 1999 to 2006. The line targeted entry-level, consumer and education markets, with lower specifications and prices than the PowerBook, Apple's higher-end line of laptop computers. It was the first mass consumer product to offer Wi-Fi network connectivity, which was then branded by Apple as AirPort.

The iBook had three different designs during its lifetime. The first, known as the "Clamshell", was inspired by the design of Apple's popular iMac line at the time. It was a significant departure from previous portable computer designs due to its shape, bright colors, incorporation of a handle into the casing, lack of a display closing latch, lack of a hinged cover over the external ports and built-in wireless networking. Two years later, the second generation abandoned the original form factor in favor of a more conventional, rectangular design. In October 2003, the third generation was introduced, adding a PowerPC G4 chip, USB 2.0 and a slot-loading drive. iBooks were very popular in education, with Henrico County Public Schools being the first of many school systems in the United States to distribute one to every student.

Apple replaced the iBook line with the MacBook on May 16, 2006 as part of the Mac transition to Intel processors.

== iBook G3 ("Clamshell", 1999–2001) ==
iBook G3 ("Clamshell")
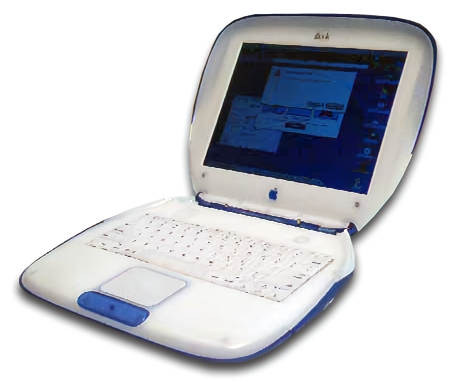
- The iBook (Firewire) in Indigo color
- Developer: Apple Computer
- Manufacturer: Alpha-Top Corp
- Type: Laptop
- Released: July 21, 1999
- Introductory price: US$1,599 (equivalent to $3,090 in 2025)
- Discontinued: May 1, 2001
- CPU: PowerPC G3, 300–466 MHz
- Successor: iBook G3 (Snow)
- Related: iMac G3; Power Mac G3; PowerBook G3
- Made in: Taiwan

In the late 1990s, Apple was trimming its product line from the large number of intersecting Performa, Quadra, LC, Power Macintosh and PowerBook models to a simplified "four box" strategy: desktop and portable computers, each in both consumer and professional models. Three boxes of this strategy were already in place: The newly introduced iMac was the consumer desktop, the Power Macintosh G3 filled the professional desktop box, and the PowerBook G3 line served as the professional portable line. This left only the consumer portable space empty, leading to much rumor on the Internet of potential designs and features. Putting an end to this speculation, on July 21, 1999, Steve Jobs unveiled the iBook G3 during the keynote presentation of the Macworld Conference & Expo in New York City.

Like the iMac, the iBook G3 had a PowerPC G3 CPU, and no legacy Apple interfaces. USB, Ethernet, modem ports and an optical drive were standard. The ports were left uncovered along the left side, as a cover was thought to be fragile and unnecessary with the iBook's new interfaces, which lacked the exposed pins of earlier connectors. Featuring a clamshell design, when the lid was closed, the hinge kept it firmly shut, so there was no need for a latch on the screen. The hinge included an integrated carrying handle. Additional power connectors on the bottom surface allowed multiple iBook G3s to be charged on a custom-made rack. The iBook G3 was the first Mac to use Apple's new "Unified Logic Board Architecture", which condensed all of the machine's core features into two chips, and added AGP and Ultra DMA support.

The iBook was the first mainstream computer designed and sold with integrated wireless networking. On the iBook's introduction, Phil Schiller, Apple's VP of Marketing, held an iBook while jumping off a height as data from the computer was transferred to another in order to demonstrate the wireless networking capability. The display bezel contained the wireless antenna, which attached to an optional internal wireless card. Lucent Technologies helped create this wireless capability which established the industry standard. Apple released the AirPort Wireless Base Station at the same time.

There was heated debate over many things such as the aesthetics, features, weight, performance and pricing. To provide sufficient impact protection, the iBook was larger and heftier than the PowerBook of the time, and yet had lower specifications. Standard features like PC card slots were absent, and so were speculated features such as touch screens and an ultra-long battery life. The iBook gained the label "Barbie's toilet seat", due to the distinctive design. Nevertheless, this same design made the iBook G3 unmistakable in movies and television shows.

The iBook was a commercial success. The line continually received processor, memory, and hard disk upgrades. FireWire and video out were later added alongside colors Indigo and Key Lime. The design was discontinued in May 2001, in favor of the new "Dual USB" iBooks.

=== Design ===
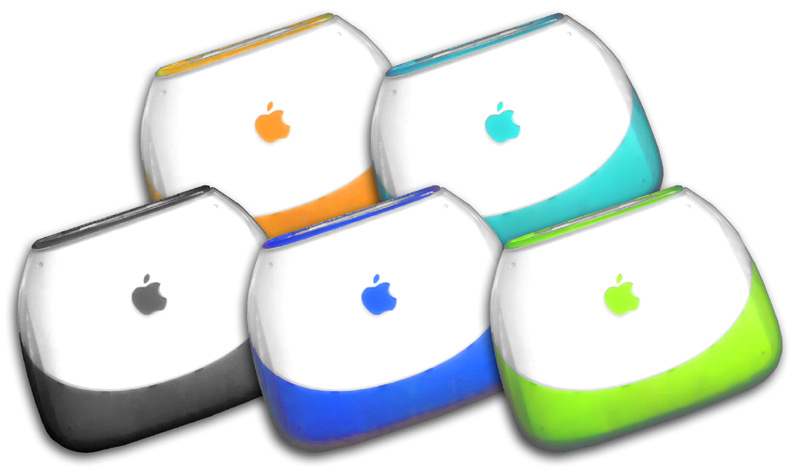
iBook G3 ("Clamshell") in all five colors: "Tangerine" and "Blueberry" on the top row, and "Graphite", "Indigo" and "Key Lime" on the bottom row. Key Lime was an Apple Online Store exclusive.

The design was clearly influenced by Apple's consumer desktop, the iMac. In fact, one of the marketing slogans for the iBook was "iMac to go." The clamshell design also echoed the eMate 300. Apple continued its trend of using transparent colored plastics for the shell, and released the iBook clamshell series in several colors, starting with Blueberry and Tangerine, later adding Indigo, Graphite and Key Lime colors when the iBook line was refreshed. However, unlike the iMac, the iBook did not feature pinstripes. Steve Jobs announced that the Key Lime color, "a little less conservative, a little more fun", was exclusive to the online Apple Store. This resulted in some crowd members booing, to which Jobs replied: "Don't you like buying on the Apple Online Store?"

Compared to follow-up iBook and PowerBook notebook computers, the Clamshell iBook proved to be the more reliable model. The original iBook is on exhibition at the London Design Museum and the Yale University Art Gallery. Vestiges of design ideas first adopted in the iBook G3 can still be seen today: moving interface ports from the back to the sides and leaving them uncovered, omitting a latch for the computer's lid, and providing multiple color options.

=== Technical specifications ===
According to Apple, all of these models are obsolete. (Note: Apple products that have been discontinued for 7 years and no longer receive hardware support or spare parts)

Model		Original		SE (Special Edition)	FireWire	FireWire SE
Timetable	Released	July 21, 1999	February 16, 2000		September 13, 2000	
Timetable	Discontinued	February 16, 2000	September 13, 2000		May 1, 2001	
Color(s)		Blueberry; Tangerine		Graphite	Indigo; Key Lime (exclusive to Apple Online Store)	Graphite; Key Lime (exclusive to Apple Online Store)
Ordering info.	Order number	M7707 (Blueberry) or M7619 (Tangerine)	M7717 (Blueberry) or M7718 (Tangerine)	M7716	M7721 (Indigo) or M7722 (Key Lime)	M7720 (Graphite) or M8245 (Key Lime)
Ordering info.	Model identifier	PowerBook 2,1			PowerBook 2,2	
Ordering info.	Model number	M2453 (EMC 1847)			M6411 (EMC N/A)	
Performance	Processor	PowerPC G3 (750)			PowerPC G3 (750CXe)	
Performance	Clock speed	300 MHz		366 MHz		466 MHz
Performance	Cache	64 KB L1, 512 KB L2 backside cache (1:2)			64 KB L1, 256 KB L2 cache (1:1)	
Performance	Front side bus	66 MHz				
Performance	Memory	32 MB of PC66 SDRAM (soldered to the logic board); Expandable to 544 MB (288 MB specified by Apple)	64 MB of PC66 SDRAM (soldered to the logic board); Expandable to 576 MB (320 MB specified by Apple)		64 MB of PC100 SDRAM (soldered to the logic board); Expandable to 576 MB (320 MB specified by Apple)	
Video	Display	12" active-matrix TFT display, 800×600 pixel resolution				
Video	Graphics	ATI Rage with 4 MB of SDRAM			ATI Rage 128 with 8 MB of SDRAM	
Video	Graphics	AGP 2x				
Storage	Hard drive	3.2 GB or 6 GB ATA	6 GB ATA		10 GB ATA	
Storage	Optical drive Tray loading	24× CD-ROM				4× DVD-ROM
Connections	Connectivity	10/100 BASE-T Ethernet; 56k V.90 modem Optional AirPort 802.11b				
Connections	Peripherals	1x USB 1.1; Audio out mini-jack			1x USB 1.1; Audio out mini-jack 1x FireWire 400	
Connections	Video out	—N/a			Composite video out	
Battery		45-watt-hour removable lithium-ion				
Operating system	Original	Mac OS 8.6		Mac OS 9.0.2	Mac OS 9.0.4	
Operating system	Maximum	Mac OS X 10.3.9 "Panther" and Mac OS 9.2.2; Unofficially, can run Mac OS X 10.4.11 "Tiger" with XPostFacto.			Mac OS X 10.4.11 "Tiger" and Mac OS 9.2.2; Unofficially, can run Mac OS X 10.5.8 "Leopard" with a G4 processor upgrade.	
Dimensions	Weight	6.7 lbs / 3.0 kg				
Dimensions	Volume	1.8×13.5×11.6 in / 4.6 x 34.3 x 29.5 cm				

=== Expandability and upgrades ===
The original iBook's only customer-serviceable parts were the RAM and AirPort card, accessed via two slots under the keyboard. No other modifications were possible in-warranty. There was no PCMCIA port for additional expansion capabilities. 40 screws needed to be removed to access the hard drive. The optical drive, however, can be accessed far more easily, requiring only 11 screws and one standoff to be removed. Later on, some users transplanted a 1024×768 LCD from the more recent white iBook into a clamshell iBook. This is only possible with the "FireWire" and "FireWire SE" models, as they have 8 MB of video RAM; the older ones only have 4 MB.

All clamshell iBooks shipped with Mac OS 8.6 or 9.0. All clamshell iBooks supported Mac OS X 10.0 through 10.3.9. Mac OS X Tiger (v10.4) can also be installed on models with a FireWire port provided they have at least 256 MB of RAM installed.

== iBook G3 Dual USB ("Snow", 2001–2003) ==
iBook G3 ("Snow")
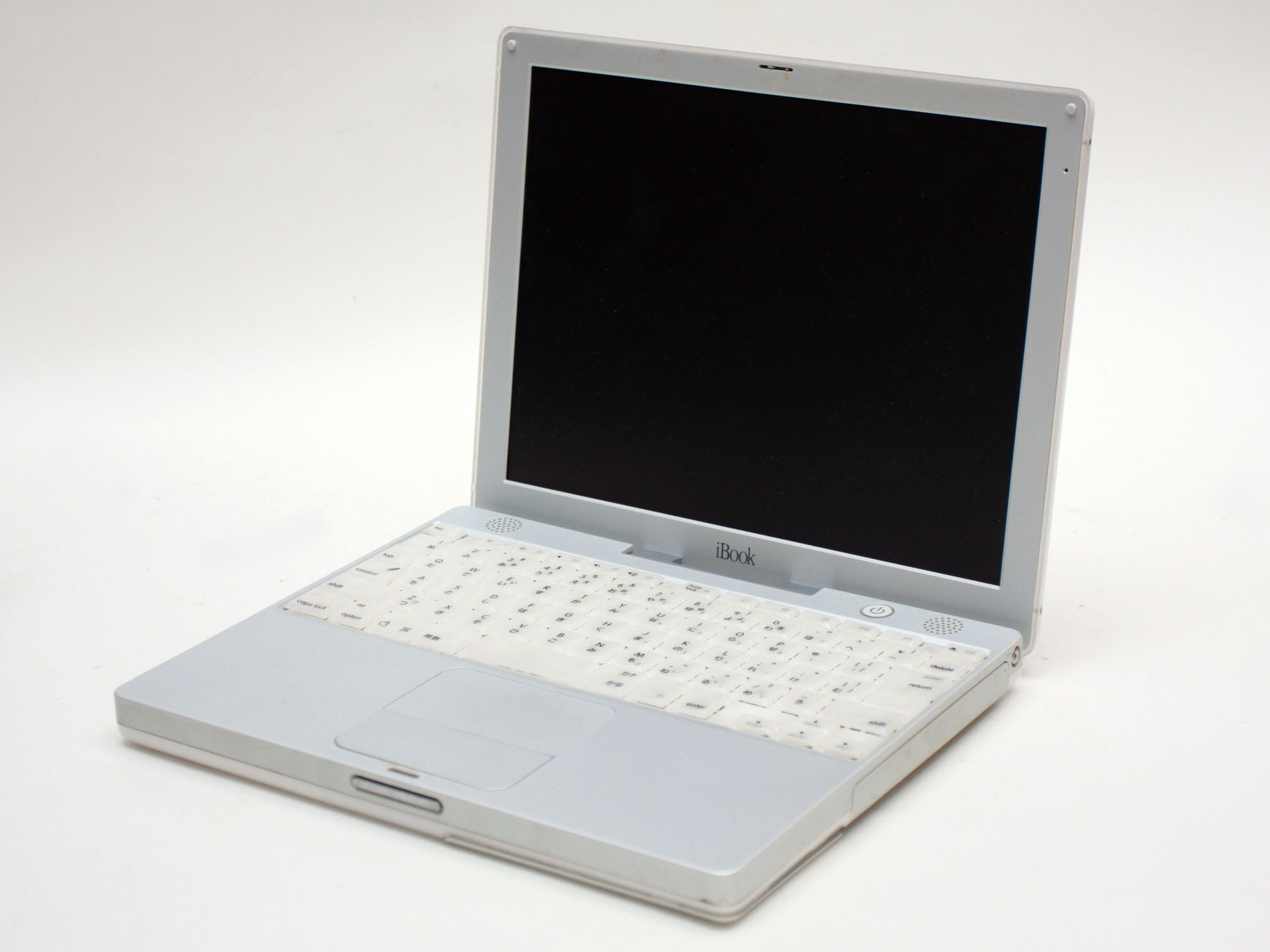
- The iBook G3 "Snow" (12.1 in).
- Developer: Apple Computer
- Manufacturer: Apple Computer; Alpha-Top Corp; Foxconn
- Type: Laptop
- Released: May 1, 2001
- Introductory price: US$1,299 (equivalent to $2,362 in 2025)-US$1,799 (equivalent to $3,271 in 2025)
- Discontinued: October 22, 2003
- CPU: PowerPC G3, 500–900 MHz
- Predecessor: iBook G3 (Clamshell)
- Successor: iBook G4
- Related: iMac G4; Power Mac G4; PowerBook G4
- Made in: the United States (by Apple), Taiwan (by Alpha-Top, 2001–2002), China (by Foxconn, 2002–2003)

Apple debuted the next-generation iBook G3 at a press conference in Cupertino, California, on May 1, 2001. The previous bold colors and bulky form-factor were abandoned, as were the handle, latch-less design and additional power connectors on the bottom surface.

The resulting iBook was available in white only, hence the name "Snow" and incorporated transparent polycarbonate in its casing. It was 30% lighter, and occupied less than half of the volume of the model it replaced, being smaller in all three dimensions. Despite that, it added an extra USB port and a higher resolution screen. Apple claimed the compact design did not sacrifice durability, saying it was "Twice as durable" as the previous model. This is the model seen in the first iPod commercial.

With this revision, Apple began transitioning to translucent and white polycarbonate casings in most of its consumer line, such as the iMac and the eMac. In contrast, most of its professional products used an anodized aluminium finish. Near the end of its run, the Snow iBook G3 case became opaque and white instead of translucent white and magnesium.

=== Technical specifications ===
According to Apple, all of these models are obsolete.

Model		Mid 2001				Late 2001			Early 2002	Mid 2002			Late 2002			Early 2003		
Timetable	Released	May 1, 2001				October 16, 2001			January 7, 2002	May 20, 2002			November 6, 2002			April 22, 2003		
Timetable	Discontinued	October 16, 2001	May 20, 2002				January 7, 2002	May 20, 2002		November 6, 2002			April 22, 2003			October 22, 2003		
Color		Translucent White											Opaque White	Translucent White		Opaque White		
Ordering info.	Model identifier	PowerBook 4,1							PowerBook 4,2	PowerBook 4,3								
Ordering info.	Model number	M6497 (EMC 1875)							M8413	A1005 (EMC 1916)		A1007 (EMC 1924)	A1005 (EMC 1916)		A1007 (EMC 1924)	A1005 (EMC 1916C)		A1007 (EMC 1924)
Ordering info.	Order number	M7698	M7692	M7699	M8520	M8597	M8598	M8599	M7701	M8600	M8602	M8603	M8860	M8861	M8862	M8758	M9018	M9009
Performance	Processor	PowerPC G3 (750cxe)				PowerPC G3 (750cx)			PowerPC G3 (745/755)	PowerPC G3 (750fx)								
Performance	Clock speed	500 MHz					600 MHz				700 MHz			800 MHz			900 MHz	
Performance	Cache	64 KB L1, 256 KB L2 cache (1:1)								64 KB L1, 512 KB L2 cache (1:1)								
Performance	Front side bus	66 MHz					100 MHz											
Performance	Memory	64 MB of PC100 SDRAM (soldered to the logic board); Expandable to 576 MB	128 MB of PC100 SDRAM (soldered to the logic board); Expandable to 640 MB						128 MB of PC100 SDRAM (soldered to the logic board) (12"); 256 MB of PC100 SDRAM (128 MB soldered to the logic board) (14"); Expandable to 640 MB									
Video	Display	12.1"										14.1"	12.1"		14.1"	12.1"		14.1"
Video	Display	TFT XGA active matrix display, 1024×768 pixel resolution																
Video	Graphics	ATI Rage 128 with 8 MB of SDRAM; AGP 2x								ATI Radeon with 16 MB of SDRAM; AGP 2x			ATI Radeon 7500 with 16 MB SDRAM; AGP 2x	ATI Radeon 7500 with 32 MB SDRAM; AGP 2x				
Storage	Hard drive	10 GB; 20 GB optional Ultra/ATA				15 GB or 20 GB; 30 GB optional Ultra/ATA	15 GB; 30 GB optional Ultra/ATA	20 GB; 30 GB optional Ultra/ATA	20 GB; Ultra/ATA			30 GB; Ultra/ATA	20 GB; Ultra/ATA		30 GB; Ultra/ATA		40 GB; Ultra/ATA	
Storage	Optical drive Tray-loading	CD-ROM	DVD-ROM	CD-RW	Combo drive	CD-ROM	DVD-ROM	Combo drive		CD-ROM	Combo drive		CD-ROM	Combo drive		CD-ROM	Combo drive	
Connections	Connectivity	10/100 BASE-T Ethernet; 56k V.90 modem Optional AirPort 802.11b																
Connections	Peripherals	2x USB 1.1; 1x FireWire 400; Audio out mini-jack																
Connections	Video out	A/V Port (VGA, composite video/sound) via adaptors								Mini-VGA (VGA, composite and S-Video) via adaptors								
Operating system	Original	Mac OS 9.1				Mac OS 9.2.1 / Mac OS X 10.1				Mac OS 9.2.2 / Mac OS X 10.1.4			Mac OS 9.2.2 / Mac OS X 10.1.5			Mac OS 9.2.2 / Mac OS X 10.2.4 "Jaguar"		
Operating system	Maximum	Mac OS X 10.4.11 "Tiger" and Mac OS 9.2.2																
Dimensions	Weight	4.9 lbs / 2.2 kg							5.9 lbs / 2.7 kg	4.9 lbs / 2.2 kg (12"); 5.9 lbs / 2.7 kg (14")								
Dimensions	Volume	1.35 x 11.2 x 9.6 inches / 3.4 x 28.5 x 23.0 cm							1.35 x 12.7 x 10.2 inches / 3.4 x 32.3 x 25.9 cm	1.35 x 11.2 x 9.6 inches / 3.4 x 28.5 x 23.0 cm (12"); 1.35 x 12.7 x 10.2 inches / 3.4 x 32.3 x 25.9 cm (14")								

== iBook G4 (2003–2006) ==
iBook G4

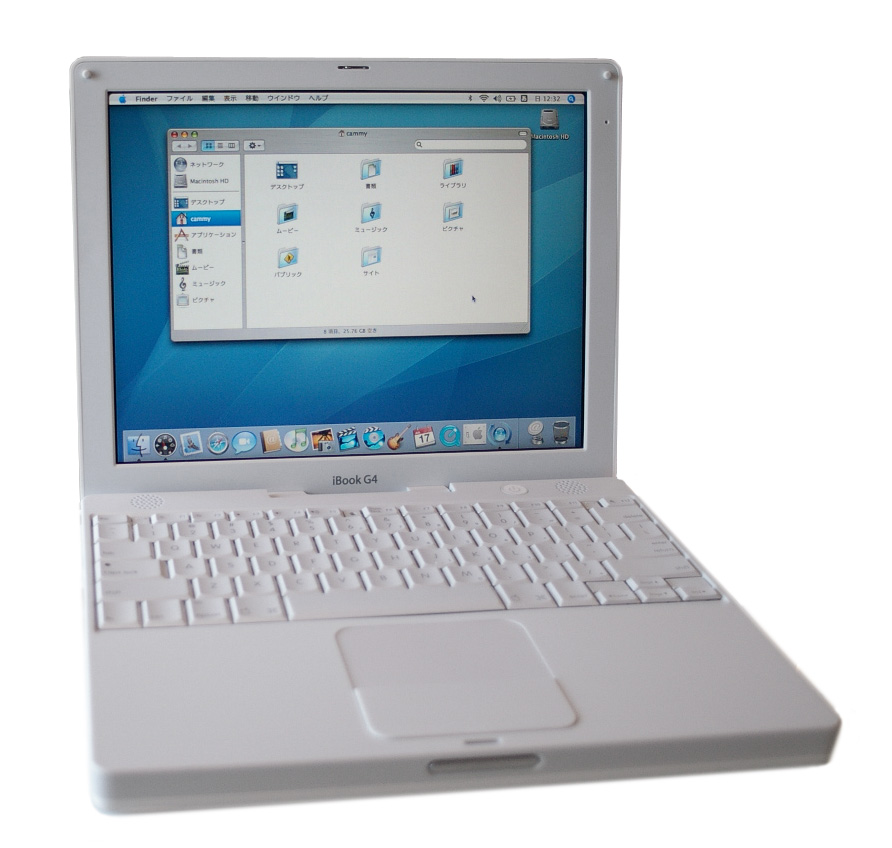
- iBook G4 (12 inch)
- Developer: Apple Computer
- Type: Laptop
- Released: October 22, 2003
- Introductory price: US$1,099 (equivalent to $1,923 in 2025)-US$1,499 (equivalent to $2,624 in 2025)
- Discontinued: May 16, 2006
- CPU: PowerPC G4, 800 MHz – 1.42 GHz
- Predecessor: iBook G3 (Snow)
- Successor: MacBook
- Related: iMac G5; Power Mac G5; PowerBook G4

Apple added a PowerPC G4 chip to the iBook Snow design on October 22, 2003, finally ending Apple's use of the PowerPC G3 chip. A slot-loading optical drive replaced the disc tray. The iBook G4 notebook also features an opaque white case finish and keyboard and a plastic display hinge. This is also the last iBook laptop released before MacBooks replaced the iBook line in 2006.

=== Technical specifications ===
According to Apple, all of these models are obsolete.

Model		Late 2003			Early 2004			Late 2004			Mid 2005	
Timetable	Released	October 22, 2003			April 19, 2004			October 19, 2004			July 26, 2005	
Timetable	Discontinued	April 19, 2004			October 19, 2004			July 26, 2005			May 16, 2006	
Color		Opaque White										
Ordering info.	Order number	M9164	M9388	M9165	M9426	M9418	M9419	M9623	M9627	M9628	M9846	M9848
Ordering info.	Model identifier	PowerBook 6,3			PowerBook 6,5						PowerBook 6,7	
Ordering info.	Model number	A1054	A1055		A1054	A1055		A1054	A1055		A1133	A1134
Performance	Processor	PowerPC G4 (7457)			PowerPC G4 (7447A)							
Performance	Clock speed	800 MHz	933 MHz	1 GHz	1.07 GHz		1.2 GHz		1.33 GHz			1.42 GHz
Performance	Cache	64 KB L1, 256 KB L2 cache (1:1)			64 KB L1, 512 KB L2 cache (1:1)							
Performance	Front side bus	133 MHz										142 MHz
Performance	Memory	256 MB of 266 MHz PC2100 DDR SDRAM (128 soldered to logic board); Expandable to 1.128 GB			256 MB of 266 MHz PC2100 DDR SDRAM (soldered to logic board); Expandable to 1.256 GB						512 MB of 333 MHz PC2700 DDR SDRAM (soldered to logic board); Expandable to 1.5 GB	
Video	Display	12.1"	14.1"		12.1"	14.1"		12.1"	14.1"		12.1"	14.1"
Video	Display	TFT XGA active matrix display, 1024×768 pixel resolution										
Video	Graphics	ATI Radeon 9200 with 32 MB of SDRAM									ATI Radeon 9550 with 32 MB of SDRAM	
Video	Graphics	AGP 4x										
Storage	Hard drive	30 GB 4200-rpm Ultra/ATA 100	40 GB 4200-rpm Ultra/ATA 100	60 GB 4200-rpm Ultra/ATA 100	30 GB 4200-rpm Ultra/ATA 100	40 GB 4200-rpm Ultra/ATA 100	60 GB 4200-rpm Ultra/ATA 100	30 GB 4200-rpm Ultra/ATA 100	60 GB 4200-rpm Ultra/ATA 100		40 GB 4200-rpm Ultra/ATA 100	60 GB 4200-rpm Ultra/ATA 100
Storage	Optical drive Slot-loading	DVD-ROM/CD-RW Combo Drive			DVD-ROM/CD-RW Combo Drive; Optional DVD±RW SuperDrive					DVD-RW SuperDrive	DVD-ROM/CD-RW Combo Drive; Optional DVD±RW SuperDrive	DVD-RW SuperDrive
Connections	Connectivity	10/100BASE-T Ethernet; 56k v.92 modem Optional AirPort Extreme 802.11b/g Optional Bluetooth 1.1						10/100BASE-T Ethernet; 56k v.92 modem Integrated AirPort Extreme 802.11b/g Optional Bluetooth 1.1			10/100BASE-T Ethernet; 56k v.92 modem Integrated AirPort Extreme 802.11b/g Integrated Bluetooth 2.0+EDR	
Connections	Peripherals	2x USB 2.0; 1x FireWire 400; Audio out mini-jack										
Connections	Video out	Mini-VGA (VGA, composite and S-Video) via adaptors										
Operating system	Original	Mac OS X 10.3 "Panther"									Mac OS X 10.4 "Tiger"	
Operating system	Maximum	Mac OS X 10.4.11 "Tiger"; Unofficially can run Mac OS X 10.5 "Leopard" with a RAM upgrade	Mac OS X 10.5.8 "Leopard" If less than 512 MB of RAM are installed, then only 10.4.11								Mac OS X 10.5.8 "Leopard"	
Dimensions	Weight	4.9 lbs / 2.2 kg	5.9 lbs / 2.7 kg		4.9 lbs / 2.2 kg	5.9 lbs / 2.7 kg		4.9 lbs / 2.2 kg	5.9 lbs / 2.7 kg		4.9 lbs / 2.2 kg	5.9 lbs / 2.7 kg
Dimensions	Volume	1.35 x 11.2 x 9.1 inches / 3.4 x 28.4 x 23.1 cm	1.35 x 12.7 x 10.2 inches / 3.4 x 32.3 x 25.9 cm		1.35 x 11.2 x 9.1 inches / 3.4 x 28.4 x 23.1 cm	1.35 x 12.7 x 10.2 inches / 3.4 x 32.3 x 25.9 cm		1.35 x 11.2 x 9.1 inches / 3.4 x 28.4 x 23.1 cm	1.35 x 12.7 x 10.2 inches / 3.4 x 32.3 x 25.9 cm		1.35 x 11.2 x 9.1 inches / 3.4 x 28.4 x 23.1 cm	1.35 x 12.7 x 10.2 inches / 3.4 x 32.3 x 25.9 cm

== Supported operating systems ==
Supported macOS releases
OS release	iBook G3 (Clamshell)			iBook G3 (Snow)						iBook G4			
OS release	Mid 1999	Early 2000	Late 2000	Mid 2001	Late 2001	Early 2002	Mid 2002	Late 2002	Early 2003	Late 2003	Early 2004	Late 2004	Mid 2005
Mac OS 8	8.6	No	No	No	No	No	No	No	No	No	No	No	No
Mac OS 9	9.0	9.0.2	9.0.4	9.1	9.2.1	9.2.1	9.2.2	9.2.2	9.2.2	Emulation only			
10.0 Cheetah	Yes	Yes	Yes	Yes	No	No	No	No	No	No	No	No	No
10.1 Puma	Yes	Yes	Yes	Yes	Yes	10.1.2	10.1.4	10.1.5	No	No	No	No	No
10.2 Jaguar	Yes	Yes	Yes	Yes	Yes	Yes	Yes	Yes	10.2.4	No	No	No	No
10.3 Panther	Yes	Yes	Yes	Yes	Yes	Yes	Yes	Yes	Yes	Yes	10.3.3	10.3.5	No
10.4 Tiger	patch	Yes	Yes	Yes	Yes	Yes	Yes	Yes	Yes	Yes	Yes	Yes	10.4.2
10.5 Leopard (Note: Mac OS X Leopard is the final release to support PowerPC Macs.)	No	No	No	No	No	No	No	No	No	patch, requires RAM upgrade	With 512 MB RAM		Yes

== Expandability and upgrades ==
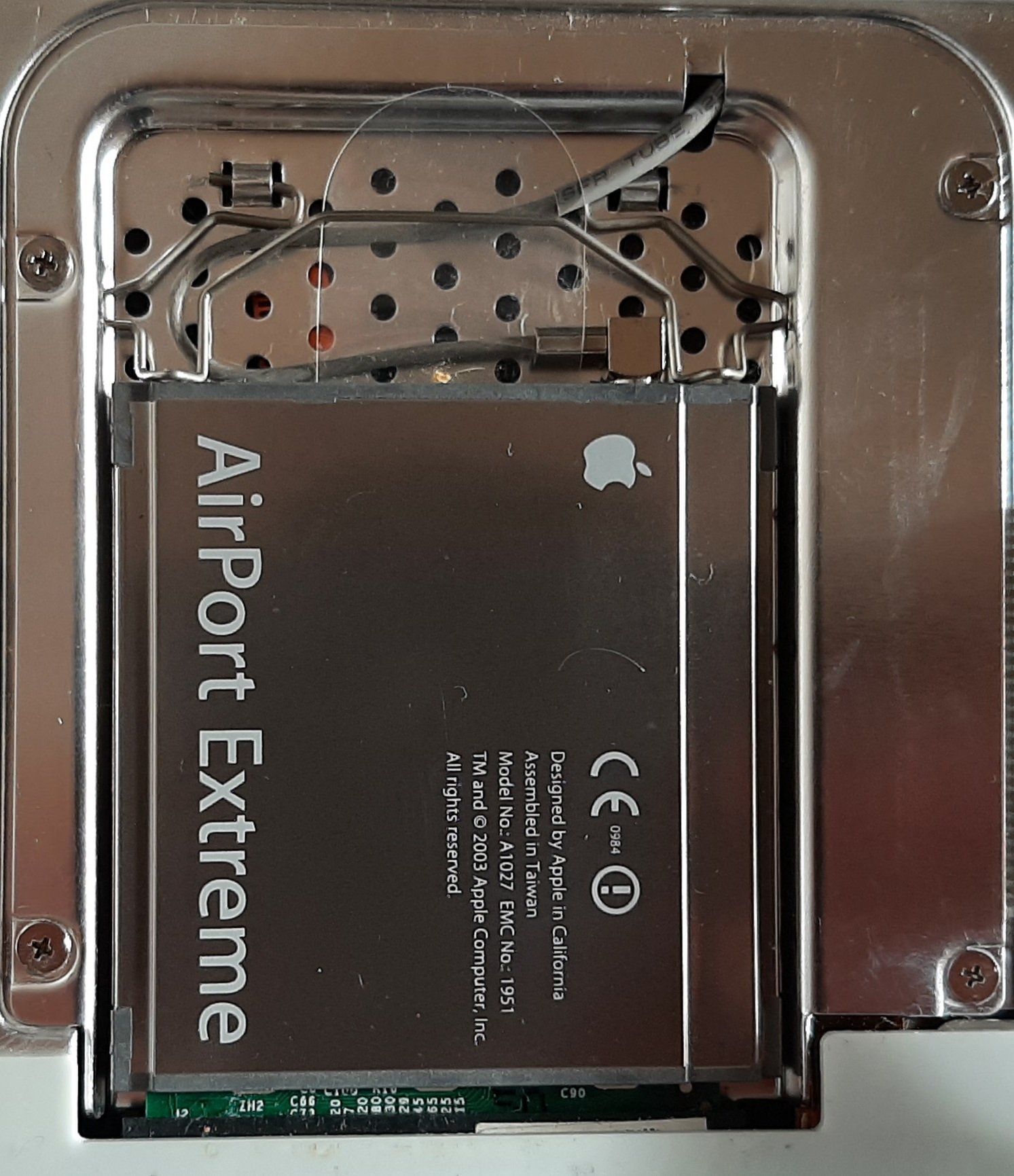
AirPort Extreme installed in an iBook G4

The iBook keyboard lifts up, allowing installation of the AirPort (wireless) card and additional memory. This gives the keyboard a "spongy" effect, especially in G3 iBooks with the translucent keyboard. The "sponginess" was corrected in the PowerPC G4 models.

Accessing the hard disk drive is complex and time-consuming, involving partial disassembly of the unit and the removal of over 30 different-sized screws.

The memory in the iBook G4 is covered by a removable AirPort card, and accessible by removing the RAM shield with a Phillips screwdriver. While some of the earlier models (e.g., 800 MHz and 933 MHz) have a specified 640 MB RAM limit, it is possible to have a total of 1.12 GB of RAM installed (128 MB built-in, plus a 1 GB SO-DIMM), or 1.25 or 1.5 GB in the later models with 256 or 512 MB of RAM soldered to the logic board.

Although no longer officially supported by macOS versions beyond those given in the chart above, the system has also been supported via MorphOS (an Amiga compatible OS) since version 3.2.

== Notes ==
- A copy of Marble Blast Gold came preinstalled on a certain version of the iBook G4 as a promotion of the game.

== Quality issues ==
Display issues with the iBook line were caused by a notoriously problematic graphics chip, which could have issues with the heatsink or the BGA soldering work done at the factory. This would manifest in symptoms such as system lockups (as the graphics chip hangs from reaching the thermal limit), or visible graphical artifacts appearing on the screen (from the graphics chip failing).

Apple initiated the "iBook Logic Board Repair Extension Program" in January 2004, which covered the expense of repairing display problems of iBook G3 models for three years. In June 2004, the Repair Extension Program was expanded to cover all White G3 iBooks.

Early models of the iBook G4 also suffered from display problems similar to those of the iBook G3, but were not covered by the repair extension program. Owners of iBooks that required expensive repairs for these problems submitted new class action lawsuits in December 2006.

On May 2, 2007, the Danish Consumer Board published an extensive 3rd party report concerning the Apple iBook G4 logic board issue. A press release referred to the global consequences that this could have for possible guarantee claims.

Some owners of the iBooks that experienced this flaw solved these issues temporarily through applying pressure to the heatsink or graphics chip, using a thin metal shim placed between the heatsink and the graphics chip. This both pushed the heatsink and graphics chip together, bridging the thermal gap, and pushing the graphics chip against the motherboard, temporarily reheating the solder beads back together.

== Timeline ==
Timeline of portable Macintoshes
See also: List of Mac models

== See also ==
- MacBook
- MacBook Air
- PowerBook
