= Combo drive =

Optical disc drive capable of burning CDs and reading DVDs

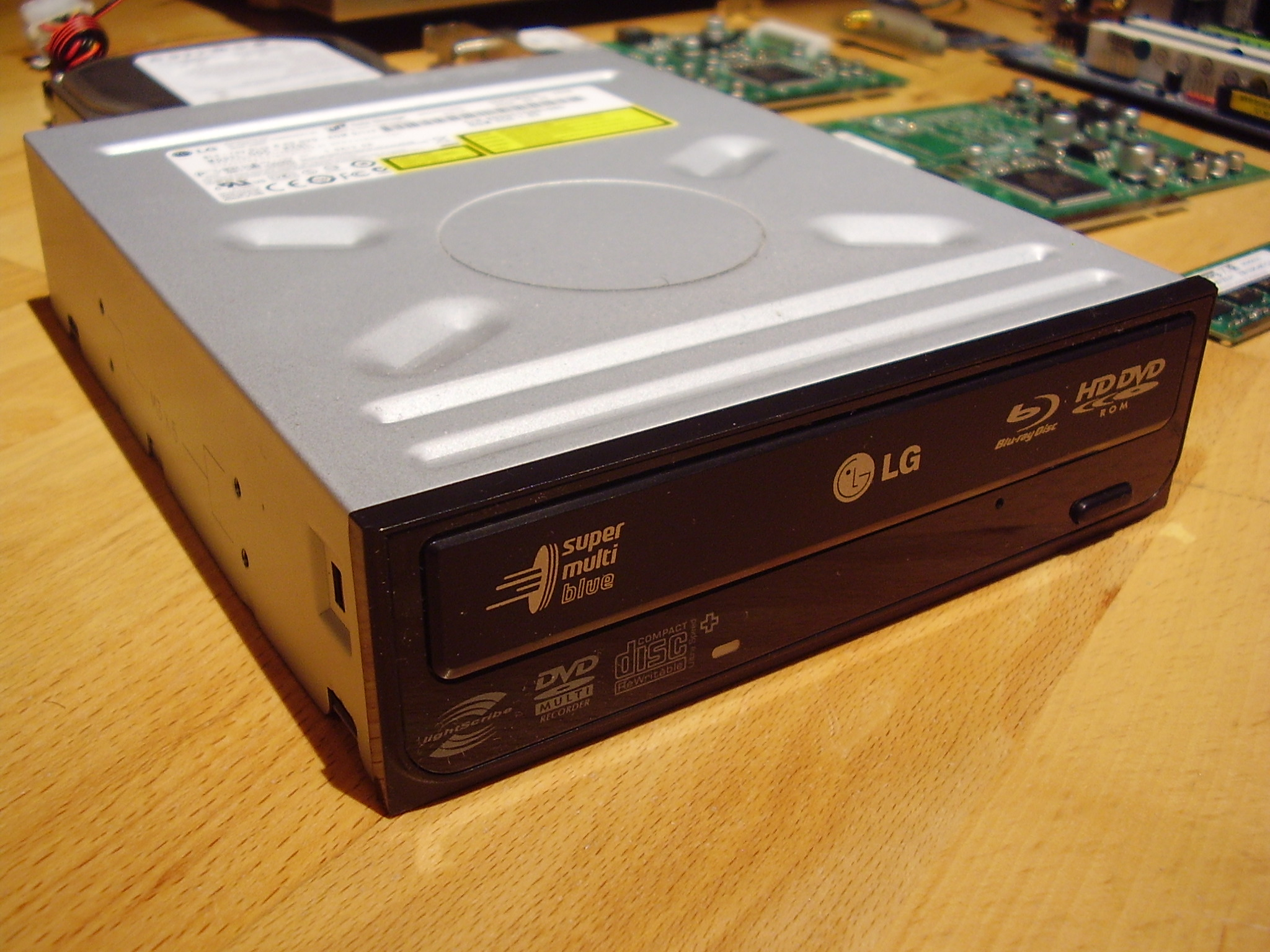
LG drive which can read and write CDs & DVDs and read Blu-ray and HD-DVD discs

A combo drive is an optical disc drive that combines two different types of optical media functionality into a single unit. The most common definition refers to a drive that can read and write to CDs but can only read DVDs. However, the term has also been used to describe newer drives that combine other formats.

== Common types of combo drives ==
CD-RW/DVD-ROM: This is the most classic and widely recognized type of combo drive. It can perform the following actions:

- Read: Standard CDs (CD-ROM), audio CDs (CD-DA), and DVDs (DVD-Video, DVD-ROM).
- Write: Write-once CDs (CD-R) and rewritable CDs (CD-RW).
- Limitation: It cannot write to DVDs.

Blu-ray/DVD/CD Combo: In a more modern context, the term "combo drive" is also used for Blu-ray drives that can read Blu-ray discs, but can only read and write to standard DVD and CD media.

== How combo drives work ==
A combo drive operates similarly to other optical drives, using a laser to read and/or write data. The primary distinction is its dual functionality, which is achieved by:

Using different laser wavelengths: DVDs and CDs use different laser wavelengths to read data. A combo drive has the necessary hardware to handle both.

Controlling laser power: To write data, the drive's laser burns microscopic pits into the disc's dye layer. To read data, it uses a less powerful laser to detect the variations in light reflecting off the disc's surface. A combo drive can operate its laser at a higher power for writing CDs but is restricted to a lower power for reading all media.

== History and market position ==
Filling a niche: When they were first introduced around the turn of the millennium, CD-RW/DVD-ROM combo drives were a more affordable alternative to a full DVD burner. They were targeted at budget computers and laptops, giving users the ability to burn CDs for music or data backup while also playing DVD movies.

Being phased out: As the cost of full-featured DVD writers dropped, combo drives became less common. By the late 2000s, most computers included a DVD writer that could also handle CDs, making the less capable combo drive largely obsolete.

Apple's naming convention: Apple famously used the term "Combo drive" for its version of this drive, distinguishing it from its more powerful "SuperDrive" (which could read and write both CDs and DVDs).

== Limitations ==
The main limitation of a combo drive is its inability to burn all of the disc formats it can read. For example:

A CD-RW/DVD-ROM combo drive cannot burn DVDs.

A Blu-ray combo drive cannot burn Blu-ray discs.

How to identify a combo drive

You can typically identify a combo drive by checking the labels or logos on the drive's faceplate.

CD-RW/DVD-ROM: It may display logos indicating support for CD-RW (writable CDs) but only DVD-ROM (read-only DVDs).

Modern Combo Drives: Manufacturers may label them with text like "Blu-Ray Disc combo drive" or "BD-ROM/DVD±RW/CD-RW drive," which explicitly indicates Blu-ray is for reading only.
