= Apple AudioVision 14 Display =

Display by Apple

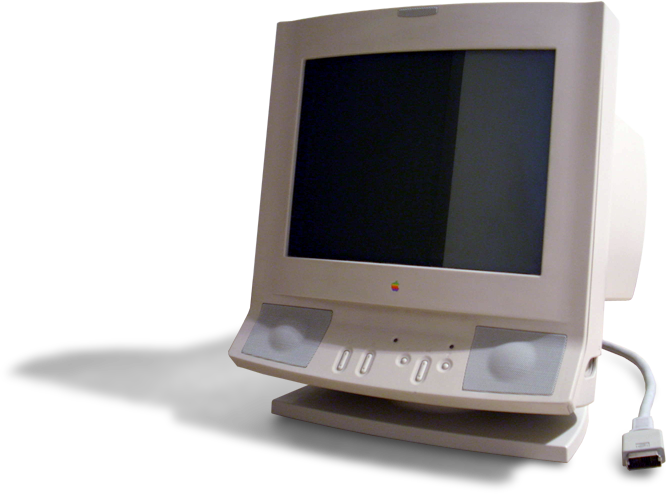
- Manufacturer: Apple Computer
- Type: Aperture grille-based CRT
- Released: August 1, 1993
- Discontinued: October 14, 1995
- Display: 640 × 480
- Dimensions: 14-inch (12.4 viewable)
- Model Number: M2001
- Successor: Apple AudioVision 1710AV

The Apple AudioVision 14 Display is a 14-inch Trinitron computer display manufactured by Apple Computer.

== Features ==
The AudioVision 14 uses the same 14-inch Trinitron (aperture grille) CRT as the Macintosh Color Display. It uses Apple's 45-pin HDI-45 connector, which Apple called the Integrated Desktop Connector (IDC). The connector carries video, audio input and output, and Apple Desktop Bus (ADB) signals through a single cable.

A unidirectional microphone is built into the top of the display. Two 2.5-inch stereo speakers are positioned below the screen. The speakers are magnetically and acoustically shielded, use a bass-reflex design, and are angled for near-field listening. An active equalizer is used to adjust their sound. Controls between the speakers adjust brightness, contrast, and volume, mute the speakers, and switch the microphone on or off. The base swivels, and the display meets Energy Star standards.

The display came with a device driver that allowed its settings to be adjusted through a control panel in Classic Mac OS. The settings were communicated to the display's microcontroller over ADB.

The Power Macintosh 6100, 7100, and 8100 series, as well as corresponding Performa and Workgroup Server models, included an HDI-45 port for direct connection to the display. Other Macintosh models could use an adapter cable that separated the IDC connection into individual connectors for video, ADB, audio input, and audio output.

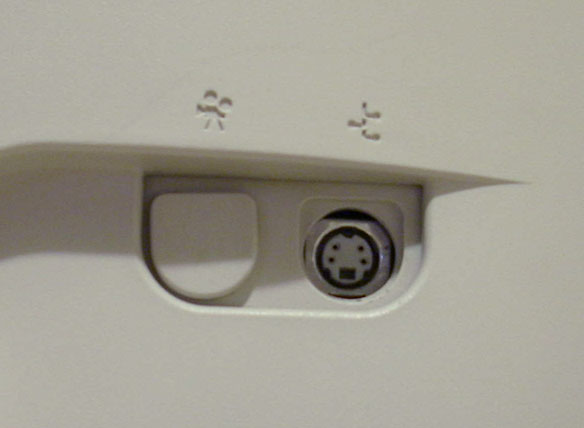
The unsupported video input port

The S-Video port on the right side of the display was intended to pass through an incoming video signal, such as one from a video camera. However, Apple did not implement this functionality, and the port remained unused. It was covered by a rubber plug when the display was shipped.

== Reception ==
In a December 1993 review, Macworld praised the microphone, and said the speakers "produce surprisingly rich, full-bodied sound", but criticized the display as "much too small for multimedia work", giving the product 3 stars out of 5. A Macworld monitor comparison gave the AudioVision 14 "acceptable" ratings for screen focus and color saturation, below the maximum ratings of "sharp" and "vivid", and found its color balance to be "uniform" (i.e. neutral). MacUser's Russell Ito called it "the first multimedia monitor", and described its speakers as "quite acceptable". In MacUser's 9th Annual Editors' Choice awards, the AudioVision 14 was a runner up in the "Best New Display Product" category.
