= Macintosh Quadra =

Family of personal computers by Apple

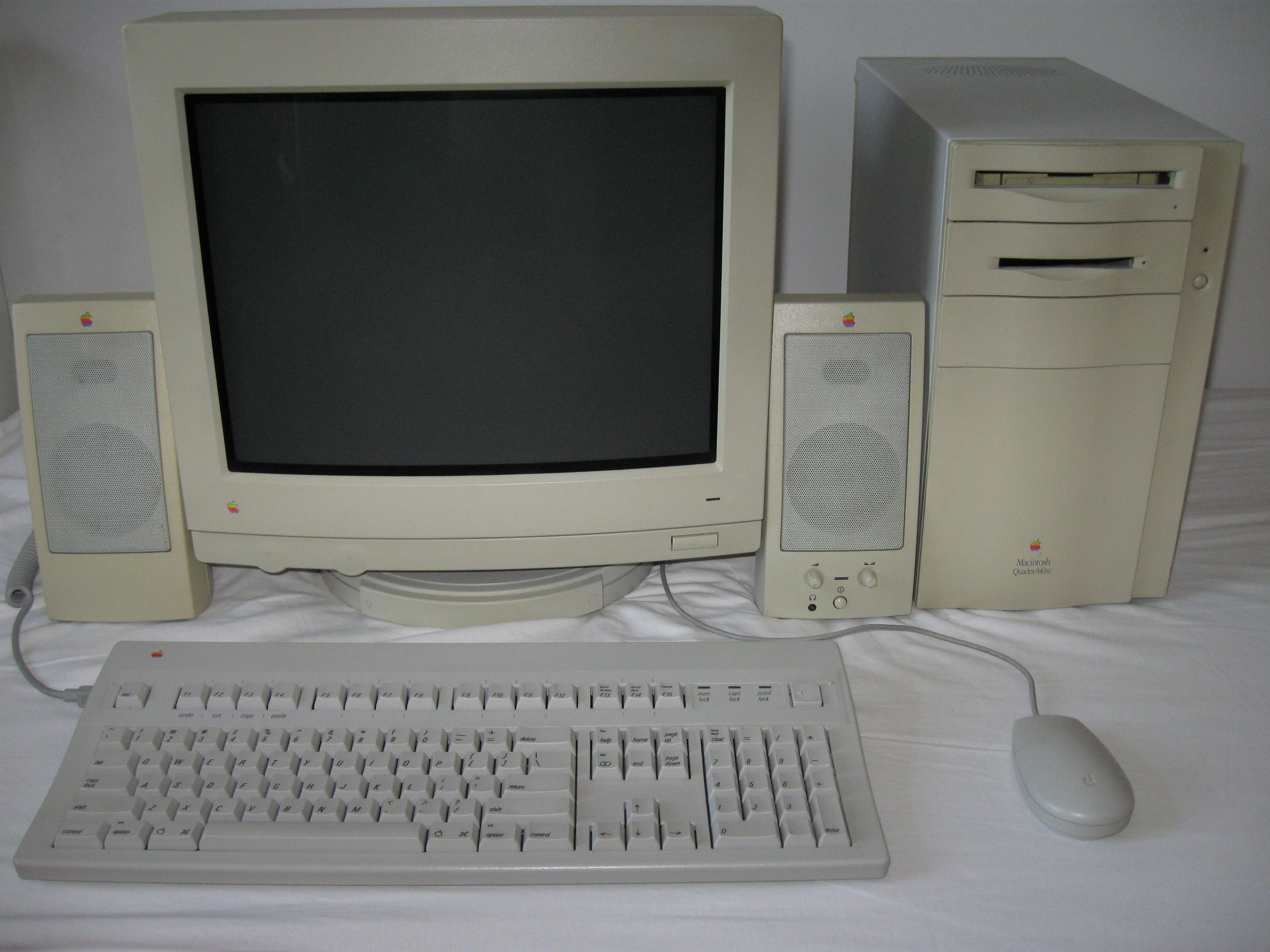
A Macintosh Quadra 840AV with accompanying keyboard, mouse, display, and speakers

The Macintosh Quadra is a family of personal computers designed, manufactured, and sold by Apple Computer, Inc. from October 1991 to October 1995. Named after the number four in the Motorola 68040 central processing unit, the Quadra succeeded the Macintosh II family as Apple's high-end Macintosh line, positioned above the entry-level LC series and mid-range Centris models.

The family was introduced with the Quadra 700 and 900 towers in October 1991 and expanded to include minitower and pizza box form factors, along with the multimedia-oriented 840AV. In October 1993, Apple merged the Centris line into the Quadra family, and extended the line into lower-priced market segments. Following the introduction of the Power Macintosh line in 1994, the Quadra family was gradually discontinued, with the 950 remaining in production until October 1995.

== Models ==
Quadra towers

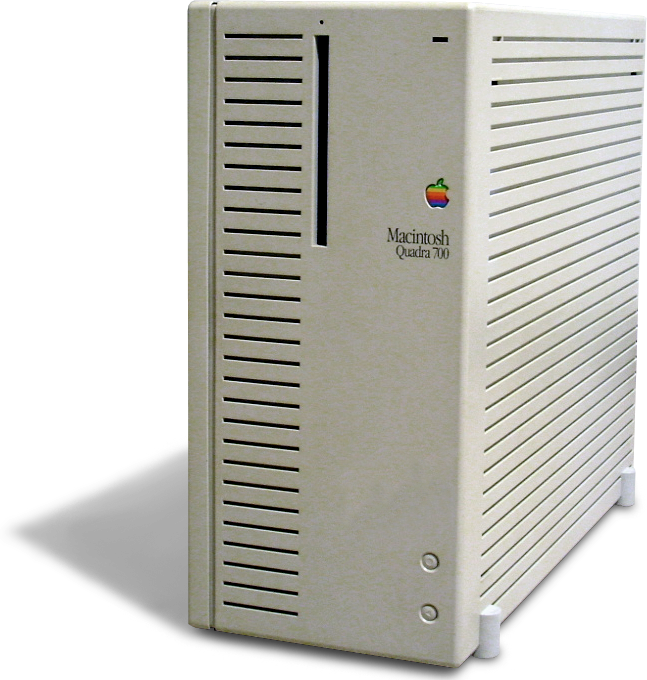
Macintosh Quadra 700

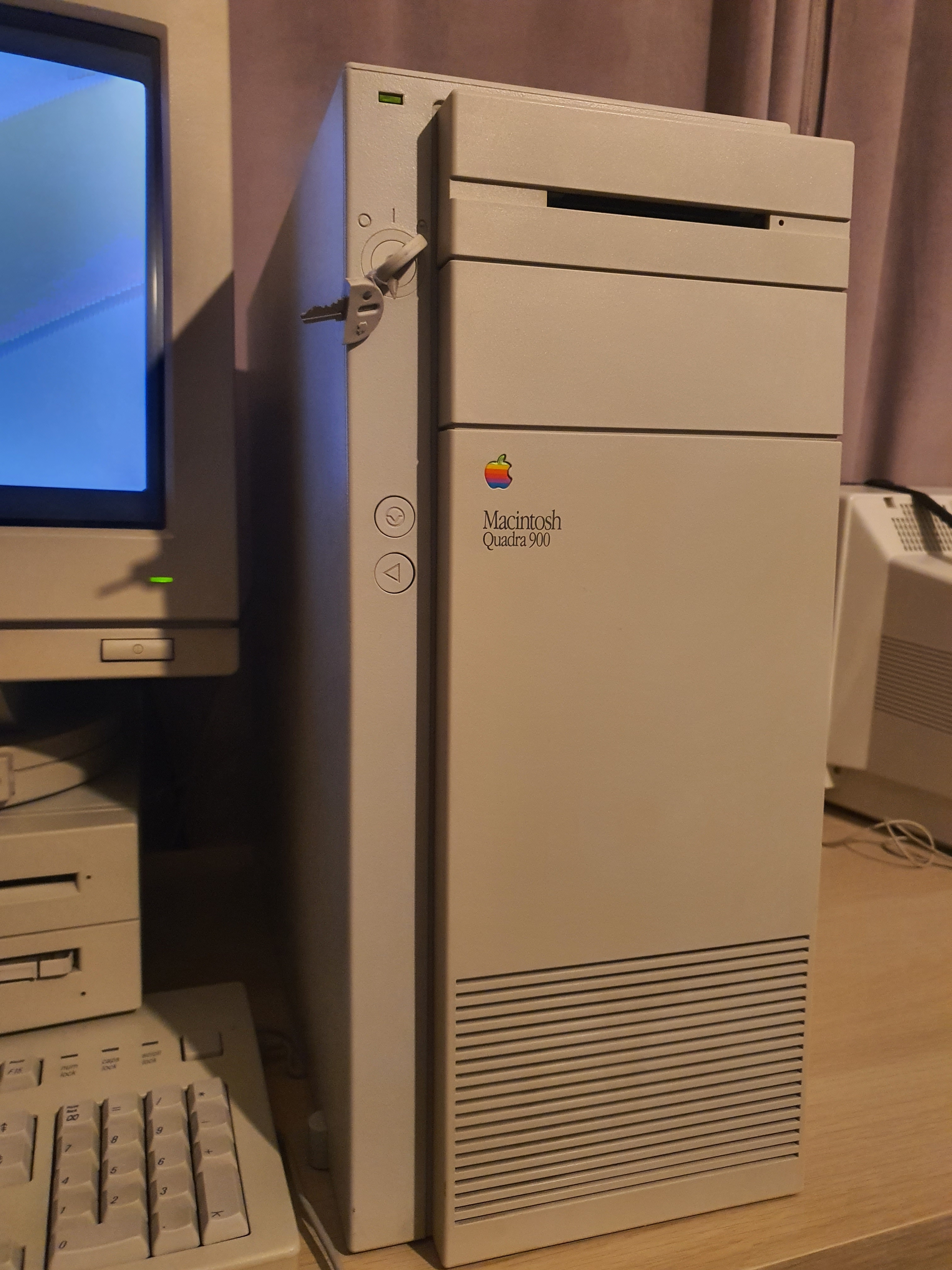
Macintosh Quadra 900

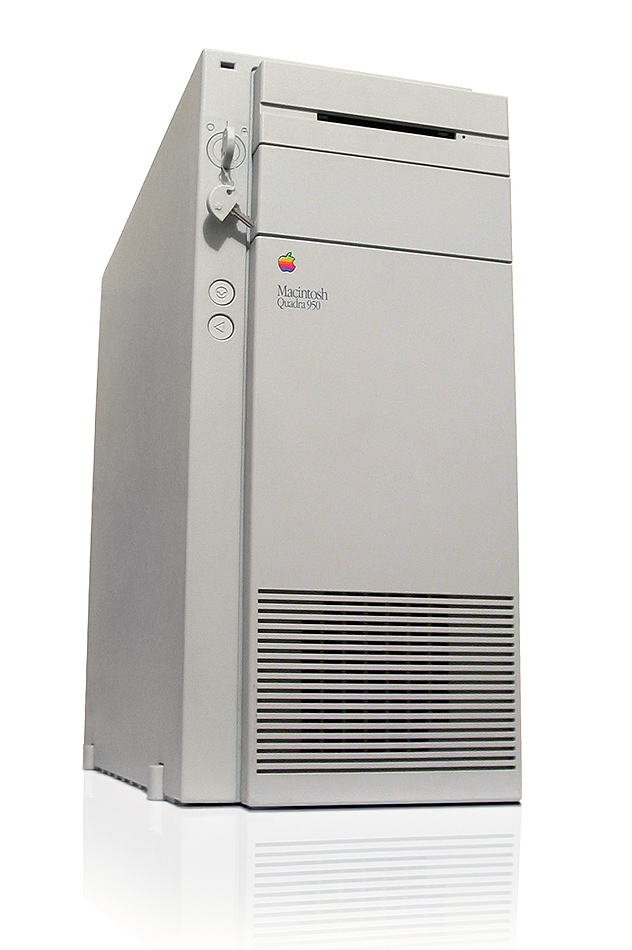
Quadra 950 / Workgroup Server 95

Quadra "pizza boxes"

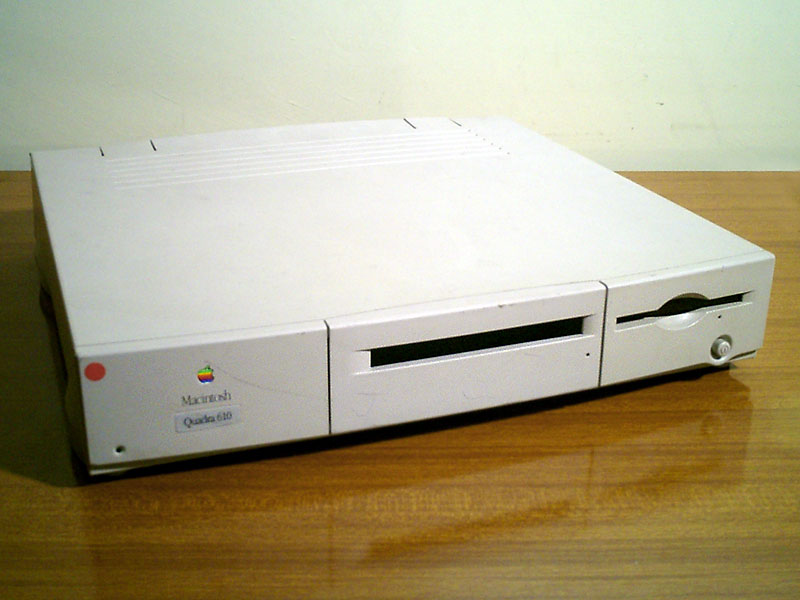
Quadra 610 / Workgroup Server 60

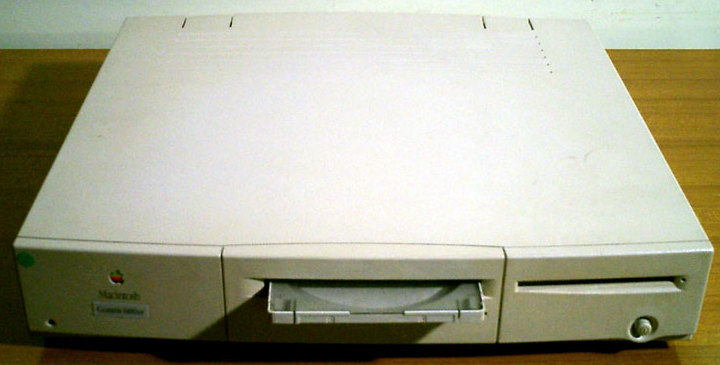
Macintosh Quadra 660AV

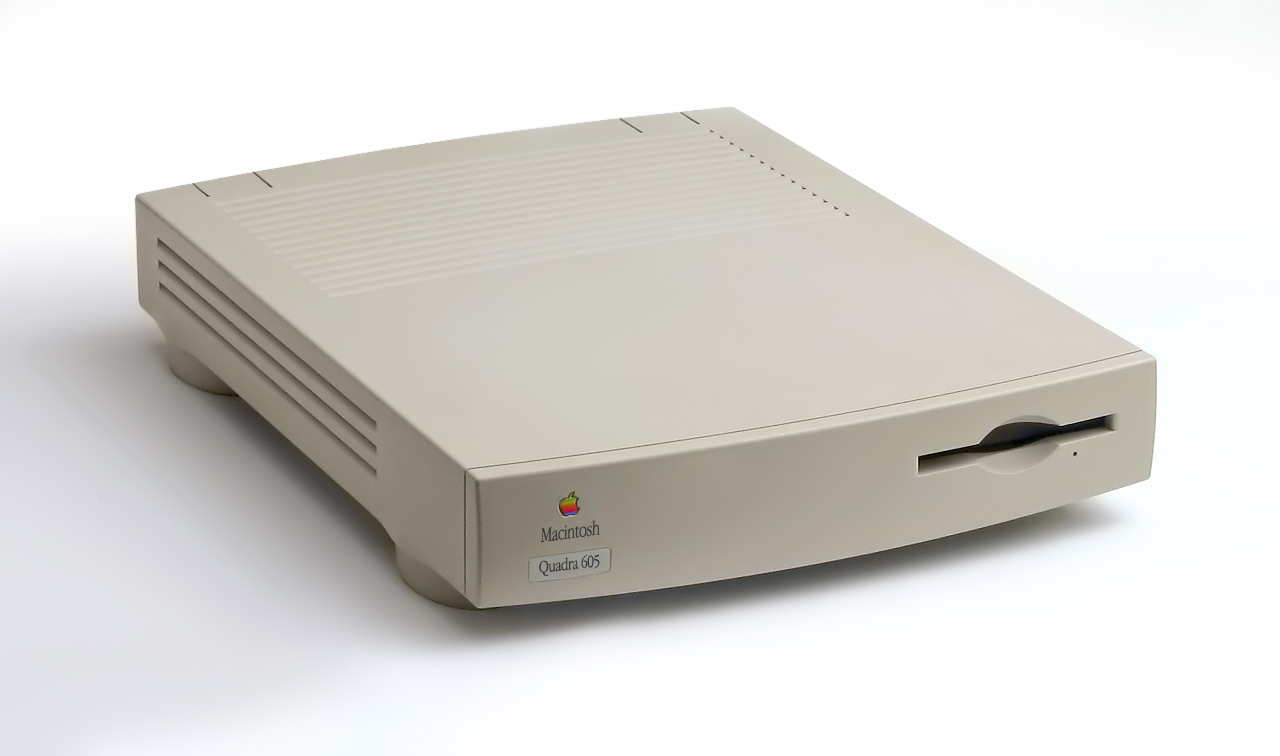
Macintosh Quadra 605

Quadra desktops

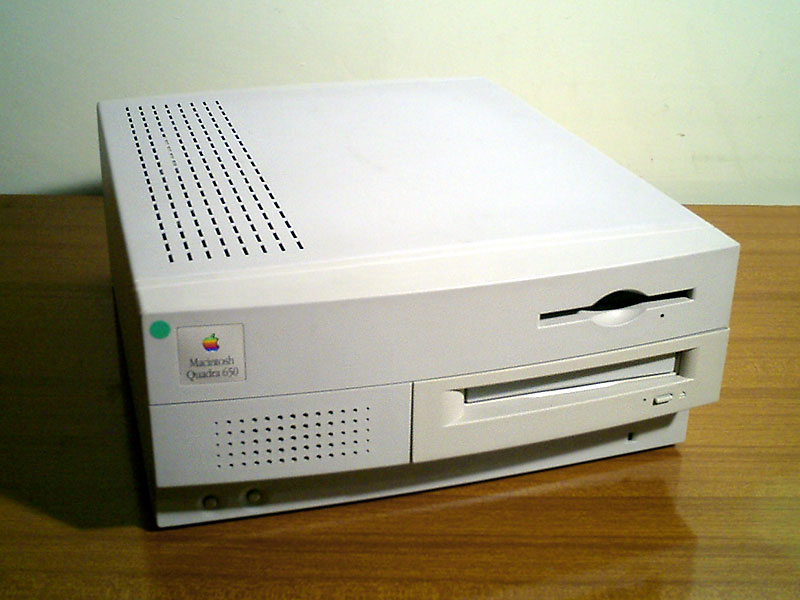
Quadra / Centris 650

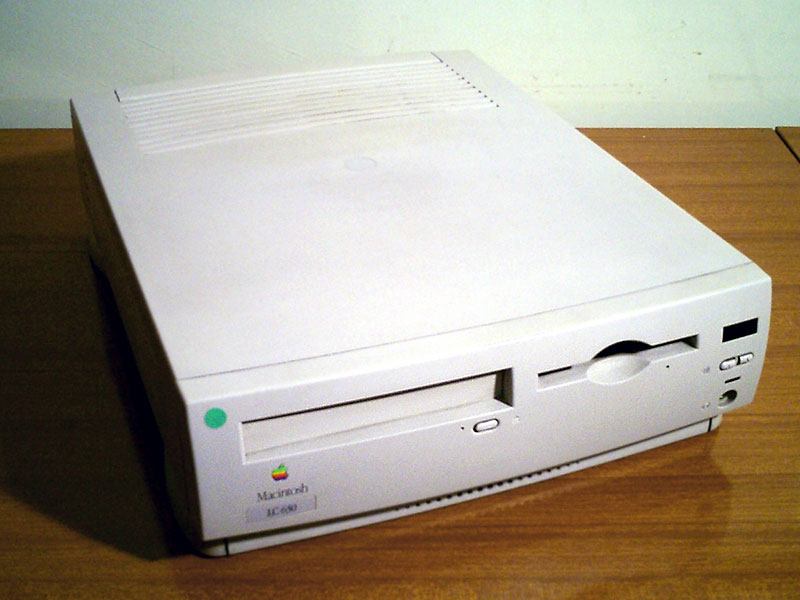
Quadra / LC / Performa 630

Quadra later towers

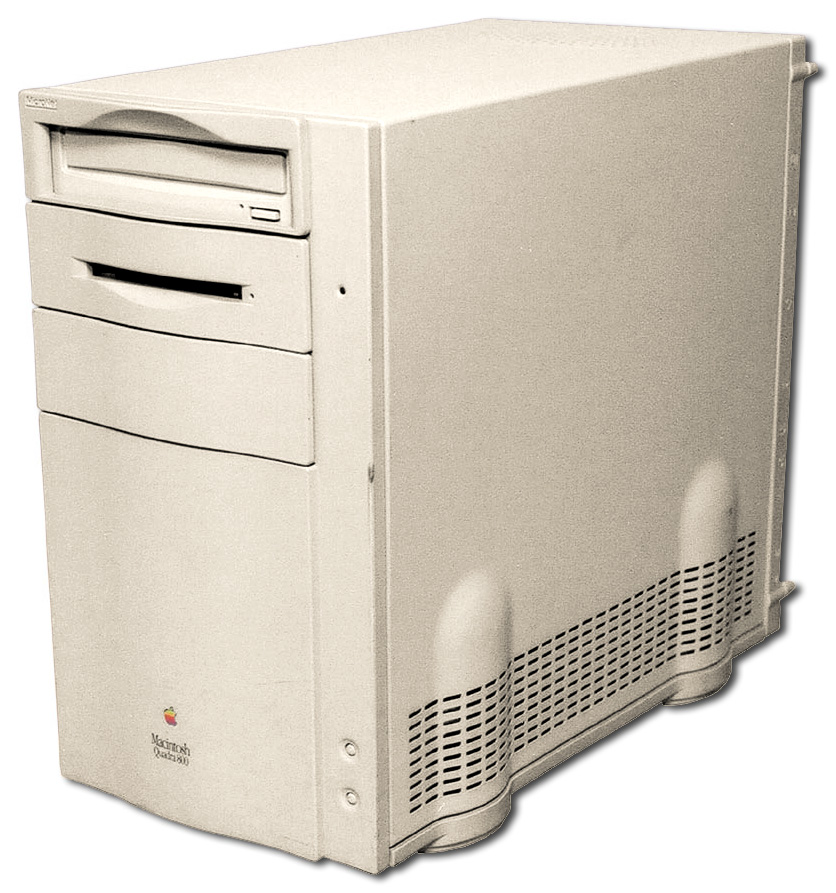
Quadra 800 / Workgroup Server 80

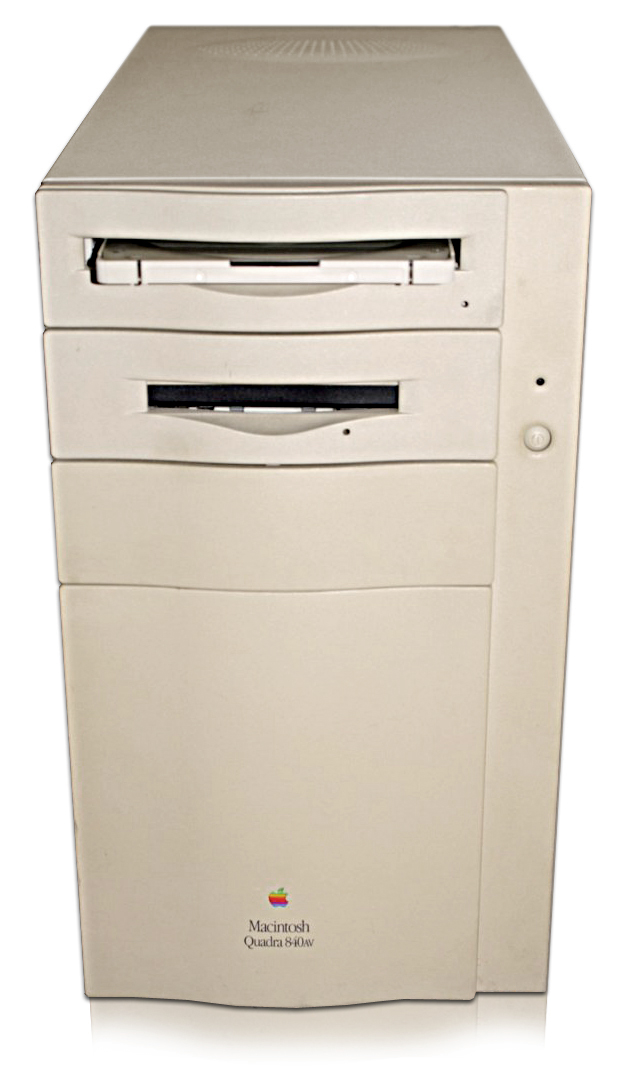
Quadra 840AV

The first computers bearing the Macintosh Quadra name were the Quadra 700 and Quadra 900, both introduced in 1991 with a central processing unit (CPU) speed of 25 MHz. The 700 featured identical case dimensions as the Macintosh IIci but vertically oriented as a mini-tower, with a Processor Direct Slot (PDS) expansion slot, while the latter was a newly designed full-tower case with five NuBus expansion slots and one PDS slot. The 900 was replaced in 1992 with the very similar Quadra 950, with a faster CPU speed of 33 MHz and improved graphics support.

The Quadra 800 was added in February 1993. It was positioned below the flagship Quadra 950 and succeeded the Quadra 700 (which was discontinued shortly after the Quadra 800's announcement). Debuting at half the price of the Quadra 950, the Quadra 800 featured the same Motorola 68040 33 MHz processor as the 950 but its additional interleaved RAM running at 70 ns, as well as an enhanced video system and SCSI bus, enabled it to outperform the 950. The Quadra 800's mid-tower case had four drive bays, giving it more expansion options than the Quadra 700's mini-tower, while having a form factor still considerably shorter than the Quadra 900/950's full tower.

In July 1993, the Quadra 840AV and 660AV (originally branded as Centris 660AV) were introduced at 40 MHz and 25 MHz respectively. They included an AT&T 3210 Digital signal processor and S-Video and composite video input/output ports, as well as CD-quality microphone and audio output ports. The AV models also introduced PlainTalk, consisting of the text-to-speech software MacinTalk Pro and speech control (although not dictation). However, all of these features were poorly supported in software and a DSP was not installed in later AV Macs, which were based on the more powerful PowerPC 601 - a CPU powerful enough to handle the coprocessor's duties on its own.

The Quadra name was also used for the successors to the Centris models that briefly existed during 1993: the 610, the 650 and the 660AV. Centris was a "mid-range" line of systems (featuring slower 68040 CPUs, often the 68LC040 which omits the FPU), between the existing Quadra on the high end (featuring the faster 68040 CPU) and the LC on the low end (built around the 68030 CPU), but it was later decided that there were too many product lines and so Centris was dropped in October 1993.

The 605 (also sold as the Performa 475 or LC 475) was also introduced in October 1993, featuring the 68LC040 as standard although it could be upgraded to the full 68040. At that point, the Quadra lineup consisted of the 950 using a full tower case, the "800-series" machines with a Mid-tower case design (Quadra 800 and 840AV), and the "600-series" (the Quadra 605, Quadra 610 and 660AV had pizza box desktop cases, while the Quadra 650 had a taller desktop case).

After the Power Macintosh line was launched in early 1994, only one more member of the Quadra family was released which was in July 1994, the Quadra 630, which was a variation of the LC 630 using a "full" Motorola 68040 instead of the LC's 68LC040, and introduced together with it in 1994. The 630 was the first Mac to use an IDE based drive bus for the internal hard disk drive, whereas all earlier models had used SCSI. All of the other Quadra models introduced in 1993 would be discontinued in 1994 after being available for sale for a year, to be replaced by Power Macintosh models, except for the Quadra 950 which continued to be sold until October 1995.

== Branding ==
Apple hired marketing firm Lexicon Branding to come up with the name. Lexicon chose the name Quadra hoping to appeal to engineers by evoking technical terms like quadrant and quadriceps.

The first three Apple Workgroup Server models, the WGS 60, the WGS 80 and the WGS 95 (mostly called "AWS 95" for "Apple Workgroup Server") were based on the Quadra 610 (originally Centris 610), the Quadra 800 and the Quadra 950, respectively.

In October 1993, to keep pace with the growing number of relatively affordable IBM compatibles powered by the Intel 80486, Apple introduced or rebranded numerous "entry-level" Quadra models (particularly the 605, 610, and later 630) for home or education use with their 68LC040 CPU, in comparison to the original models (700, 800/840AV, 900/950) which were positioned as high-end workstations due to their 68040 CPU and higher RAM ceilings. These low-end models arguably devaluated the Quadra branding, as the "600-series" also featured the higher-end models 650 and 660AV that more faithful to the original Quadra family (despite being rebranded from Centris). Furthermore, the 605 and 630 were sold under the LC and Performa labels which created further confusion among consumers, whereas the more expensive Quadra models did not have an alternative branding. Ultimately, the Quadra family's demise was hastened as models were succeeded by the Power Macintosh, the latter family aiming to compete with IBM compatibles powered by the Pentium (P5).

== Processor ==
The transition to the Motorola 68040 was not as smooth as the previous transitions to the Motorola 68020 or Motorola 68030. Due to the Motorola 68040's split instruction and data caches, the Quadra had compatibility problems with self-modifying code (including relocating code, which was common under the Macintosh memory model). Apple partially fixed this by having the basic Mac OS memory copy call flush the caches. This solved the vast majority of stability problems, but negated much of the Motorola 68040's performance improvements. Apple also introduced a variant of the memory copy call that did not flush the cache. The new trap was defined in such a way that calling it on an older version of Mac OS would simply call the previous memory copy routine. The net effect of this was that many complex applications were initially slow or prone to crashing on the 68040, although developers quickly adapted to the new architecture by relying on Apple's memory copy routines rather than their own (or flushing the cache) and using the memory copy that did not flush the cache when appropriate (most of the time).

== Specifications ==
According to Apple, all of these models are obsolete. (Note: Apple products that have been discontinued for 7 years and no longer receive hardware support or spare parts)

Model		Quadra 700	Quadra 900	Quadra 950	Quadra 800	Quadra 650 (Centris 650)	Quadra 610 (Centris 610)	Quadra 660AV (Centris 660AV)	Quadra 840AV	Quadra 605 (LC 475, Performa 475, Performa 476)	Quadra / LC / Performa 630
Timetable	Predecessor	IIci	IIfx	Quadra 900	Quadra 700	IIvi/vx	IIsi	None	Quadra 950 & Quadra 800	LC III	Quadra 610
Timetable	Released	October 21, 1991		May 18, 1992	February 9, 1993		February 10, 1993	July 29, 1993		October 21, 1993	July 15, 1994
Timetable	Discontinued	March 15, 1993	May 18, 1992	October 14, 1995	March 14, 1994	September 12, 1994	July 18, 1994	September 12, 1994	July 18, 1994	October 17, 1994	October 5, 1995
Timetable	Successor	Centris 650 & Quadra 800	Quadra 950	Power Macintosh 9500	Quadra 840AV & Power Macintosh 8100	Quadra 630 & Power Macintosh 6100/60AV	Quadra 630 & Quadra 660AV & Power Macintosh 6100	Power Macintosh 8100/80AV	Power Macintosh 7100/66AV & Power Macintosh 8100/80AV	LC 520	Power Macintosh 6300
Model	Marketing model no.	M5921	M4210	M6710	M1287	M2107	M2372	M2691	M9025	M1821	M3491
Model	Model number	M5920	M4200	M4300	M1206	M2118	M2113	M9040	M9020	M1476	M3076
Model	Gestalt ID	22	20	26	35	36	53	60	78	89	98
Enclosure		Macintosh IIcx tower/desktop	Mac Quadra 900 tower		Mac Quadra 800 tower	Mac IIvx desktop	Mac Centris 610 desktop		Mac Quadra 800 tower	Mac Quadra 605 desktop	Mac Quadra 630 desktop
Performance	Processor	25 MHz; Motorola 68040	25 MHz; Motorola 68040	33 MHz; Motorola 68040 (25 MHz Motorola 68LC040 or 68040 for Centris 650)			25 MHz; Motorola 68040 (20 MHz Motorola 68LC040 for Centris 610)		40 MHz; Motorola 68040	25 MHz; Motorola 68LC040	33 MHz; Motorola 68040 (Motorola 68LC040 for LC and Performa)
Performance	Memory	4 MB (expandable to 68 MB)	4 MB (expandable to 256 MB)	8 MB (expandable to 256 MB)	8 MB (expandable to 136 MB)	4 MB (expandable to 132 MB) or 8 MB (expandable to 136 MB)	4 MB (expandable to 68 MB)	8 MB (expandable to 68 MB)	8 or 16 MB (expandable to 128 MB)	4 or 8 MB (expandable to 36 MB)	4 MB (expandable to 36 MB)
Performance	Memory	4 x 80 ns 30-pin SIMM	16 x 80 ns 30-pin SIMM		4 x 60 ns 72-pin SIMM	1 x 80 ns 72-pin SIMM	2 x 80 ns 72-pin SIMM	2 x 70 ns 72-pin SIMM	4 x 60 ns 72-pin SIMM	1 x 80 ns 72-pin SIMM	
Video card		512 KB – 2 MB; 6 x 100 ns VRAM SIMM slots	1 MB – 2 MB; 6 x 100 ns VRAM SIMM slots	1 MB – 2MB; 4 x 80 ns VRAM SIMM slots	512 KB – 1MB; 2 x 80 ns VRAM SIMM slots		512 KB – 1MB; 2 x 100 ns VRAM SIMM slots	1 MB; 1 x 80 ns VRAM SIMM slot	1 MB – 2 MB; 4 x 80 ns VRAM SIMM slots	512 KB – 1 MB; 2 x 80 ns VRAM SIMM slots	1 MB; 1 x 60 ns VRAM SIMM slot
Storage	Hard drive	0, 80, 160 or 400 MB (SCSI)	0, 160 or 400 MB (SCSI)	230, 400 MB, or 1 GB (SCSI)	230 or 500 MB (SCSI)		160 or 230 MB (SCSI)	230 or 500 MB (SCSI)	230, 500 MB, or 1 GB (SCSI)	80 or 160 MB (SCSI)	250 MB (IDE)
Storage	Optical drive	None		None (Optional 2x CD-ROM)						None	None (Optional 2x CD-ROM)
Ports		2 x ADB; 2 x DIN-8 RS-422; SCSI DB-25									
Operating system	Minimum	System 7.0.1; A/UX	System 7.0.1		System 7.1						System 7.1.2P
Operating system	Maximum	Mac OS 8.1; Mac OS 9.1 (with PowerPC upgrade)									

== Timelines ==
Timeline of Macintosh Centris, LC, Performa, and Quadra models, colored by CPU type

See also: List of Mac models

== See also ==
- List of Macintosh models grouped by CPU type
- Timeline of Macintosh models
