= Macintosh Quadra 840AV =

Personal computer by Apple Computer

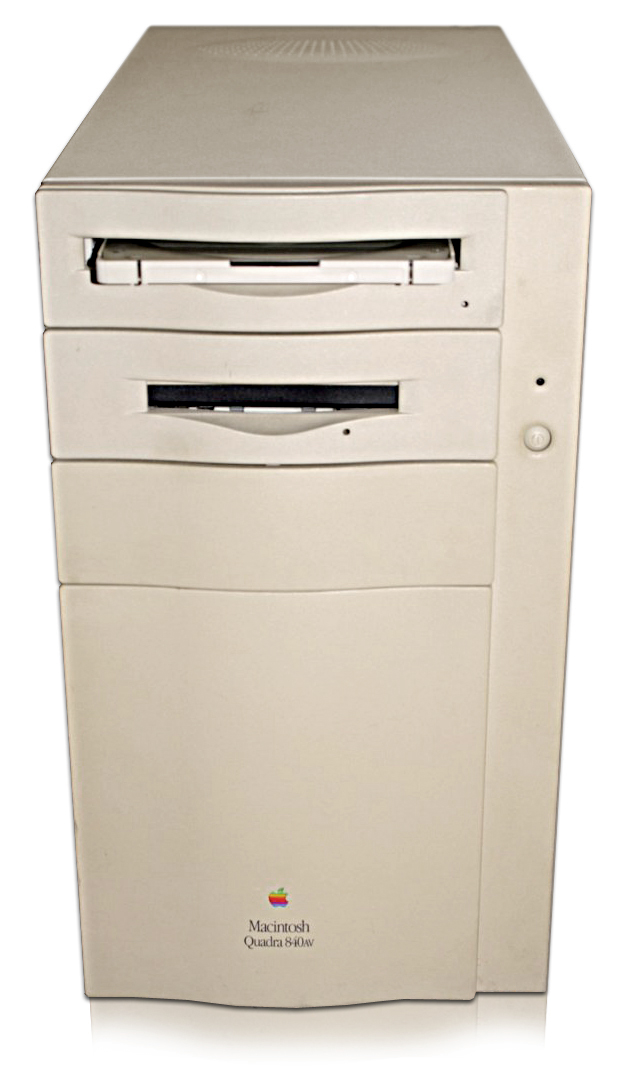
- Also known as: "Quadra 1000", "Cyclone"
- Developer: Apple Computer
- Product family: Macintosh Quadra
- Released: July 29, 1993; 33 years ago
- Introductory price: US$3,500 (equivalent to $7,800 in 2025)
- Discontinued: July 18, 1994
- Operating system: System 7.1 - Mac OS 8.1
- CPU: Motorola 68040 @ 40 MHz
- Memory: 8 MB, expandable to 128 MB (60 ns 72-pin SIMM)
- Dimensions: Height: 14 inches (36 cm); Width: 7.7 inches (20 cm); Depth: 15.75 inches (40.0 cm)
- Weight: 25.3 pounds (11.5 kg)
- Predecessor: Macintosh Quadra 800
- Successor: Power Macintosh 7100/66AV; Power Macintosh 8100/80AV
- Related: Macintosh Quadra 660AV

The Macintosh Quadra 840AV is a personal computer designed, manufactured, and sold by Apple Computer from July 1993 to July 1994. It was introduced alongside the Centris 660AV, where "AV" signifies audiovisual capabilities, such as video input and output, telecommunications, speech recognition, and enhanced audio. The 840AV has the same mini-tower form factor as the Quadra 800, with a significantly different logic board that includes a faster Motorola 68040 processor.

The Quadra 840AV was discontinued shortly after the introduction of the PowerPC-based Power Macintosh. The Power Macintosh 8100/80AV provides the same functionality in the same form factor, and had a significantly higher price point. The 7100/66AV was priced comparably to the 840AV but in a IIvx-style desktop case.

== Hardware ==
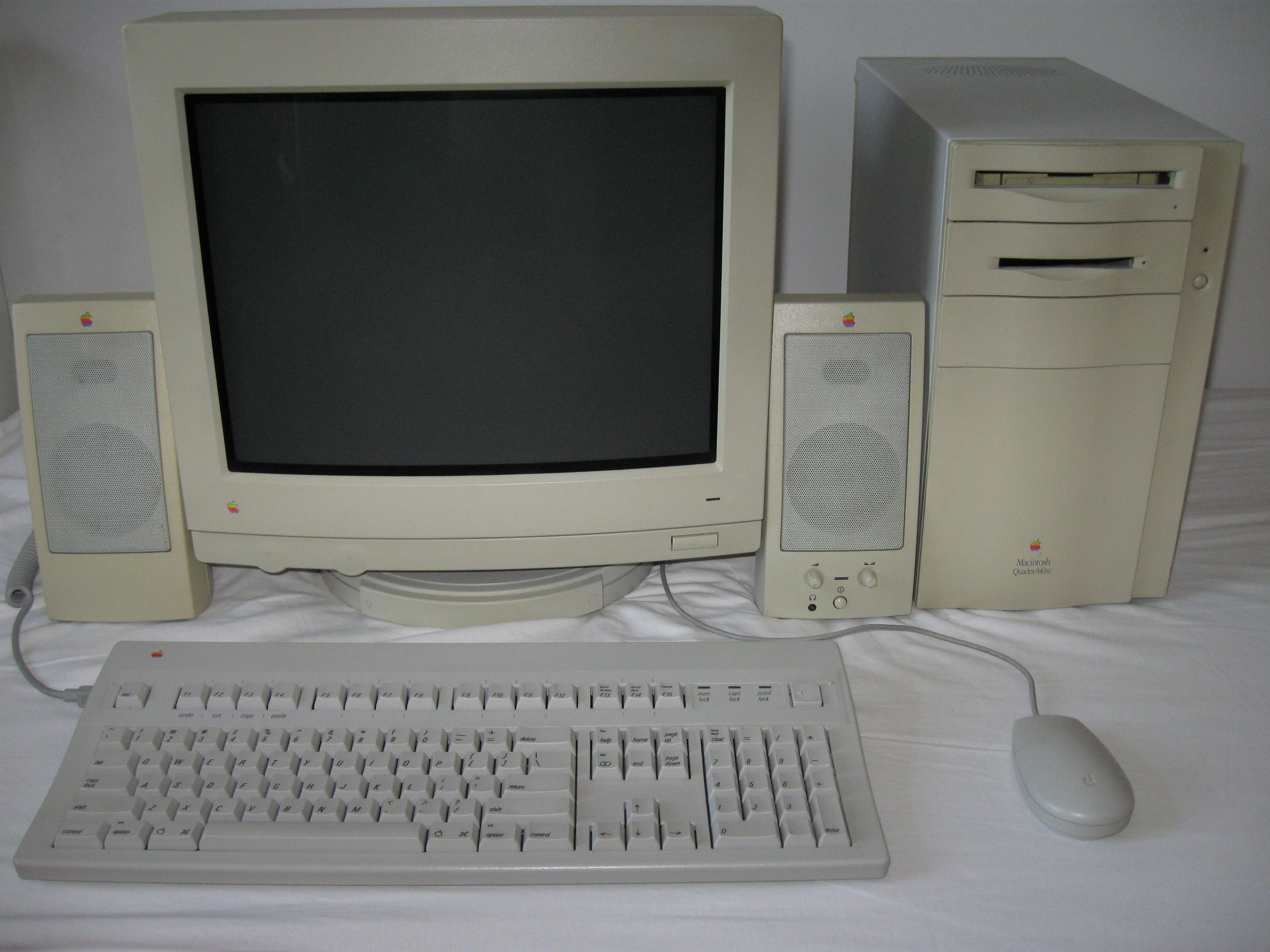
The Macintosh Quadra 840AV with a 16" Macintosh Color Display (M1298), AppleDesign Powered Speakers (M6082), an Apple Extended Keyboard II (M3501) and an Apple Desktop Bus Mouse II (M2706)

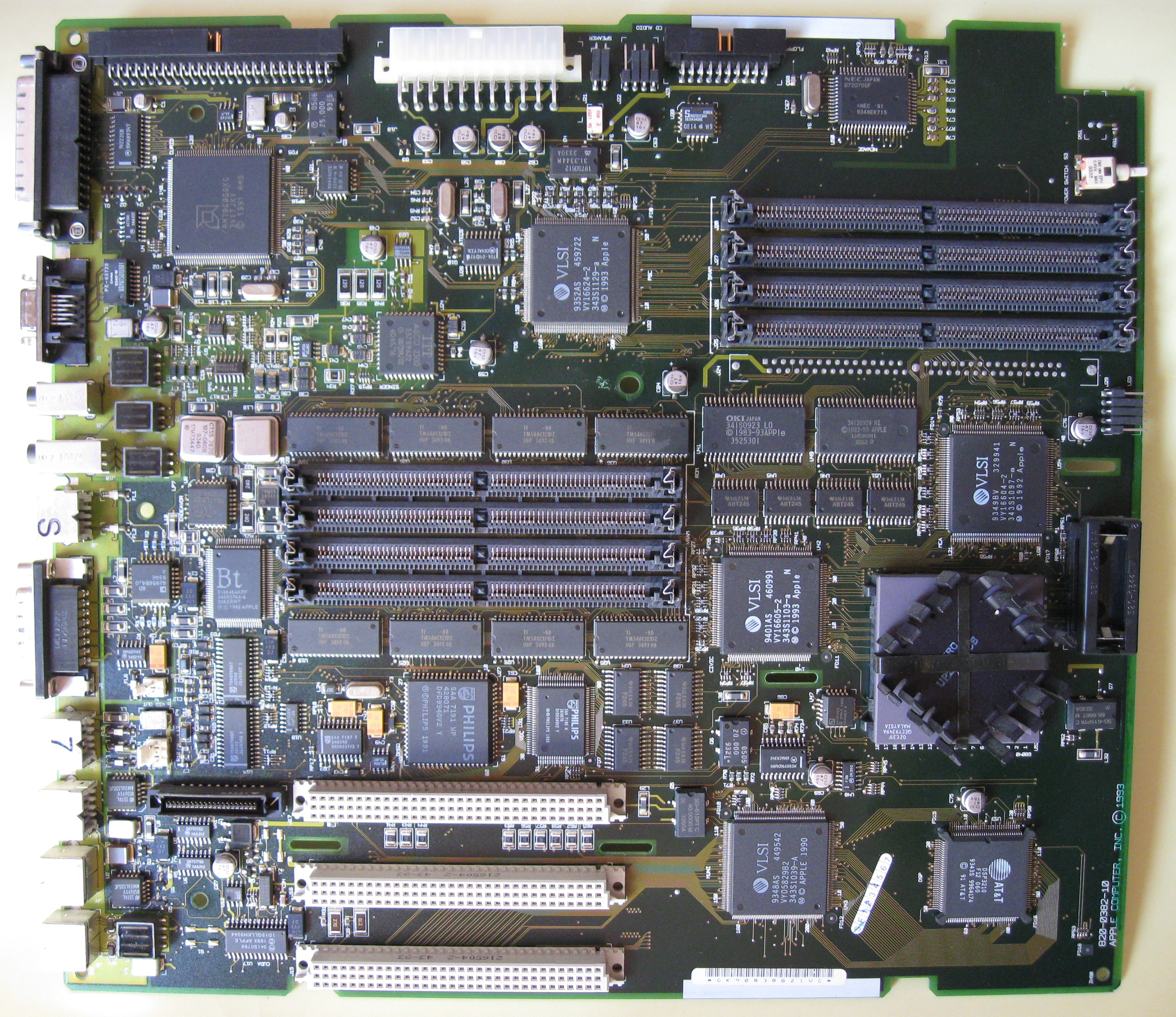
Macintosh Quadra 840AV logic board

At launch, Quadra 840AV's 40 MHz Motorola 68040 CPU and interleaved RAM made it the fastest Macintosh available, topping both the nominally higher-end Quadra 950 and the Quadra 800 by 7 MHz. The 840AV is the only Mac to use the 40 MHz-clocked 68040, and it remains the fastest 68k Macintosh of all time, because all later high-end Macintoshes are PowerPC-based Power Macintoshes. It sports a faster 66.7 MHz AT&T DSP 3210 Digital Signal Processor chip, compared with the 55 MHz variant in the 660AV. The on-board DSP was primarily intended to speed up audio/video processing, although few Mac programs make use of this due to the complexity of programming it.

The Quadra 840AV includes 1 MB of VRAM that can be expanded to 2 MB to support 24-bit color, a capability shared only with the Quadra 700 and Quadra 900/950. Other new Quadra and Centris models released in 1993 do not support 24-bit color unless a video card is used.

The 840AV and its relative, the Centris/Quadra 660AV, marked a number of firsts for the Macintosh family. They are the first Macintoshes to include on-board 16-bit 48 kHz stereo audio playback and recording capability, and S-Video and composite video input and output. To improve video playback, two separate frame buffers are used: one for standard graphics, and one specifically for video. This enables the live video input to be displayed as a scalable "window" within the Macintosh user interface. They are also the first personal computers that supported speech recognition (PlainTalk) out-of-the-box. The Apple GeoPort Telecom Adapter Kit introduced with the AV Macs add many DSP-based telecommunication functions, such as modem, fax, and telephony.

The Quadra 840AV has a similar case to the earlier Macintosh Quadra 800; the housing, chassis, power supply, and internal storage assemblies are the same, but the front and rear panels changed, with the power button being moved to the front.

Internally, the 840AV is significantly different. Apart from the faster processor, the logic board lacks the 800's Processor Direct Slot and second ADB port, but has a DAV slot (in line with NuBus slot A) and the new GeoPort. Also, unlike the 800's 8 MB of fixed RAM, all of the 840AV's memory is in SIMMs (this is the reason why the maximum amount of memory is lower).

The way in which the 840AV deals with its memory (DRAM) differs from the other machines of its generation (Quadra 700, 800, 950) in that 4, 8, 16, or 32 MB 72-pin 60ns SIMMs may be installed up to 128 MB and sizes can be mixed. Nonetheless, the Quadra 840AV does not support 1 MB, 2 MB, or 64 MB SIMMs. The 840AV and 660AV are the first Macintosh computers to operate in 32-bit mode at all times, and cannot be toggled back to 24-bit mode, which may be useful for using early Nubus cards that conform to the 24-bit addressing.

The Quadra 840AV was part of a hardware package that was offered with the initial release of Media 100.

== Reception ==
Jonathan Chevreau of the National Post said on August 7, 1993, that the Quadra 840AV and Centris 660AV were the next most interesting multimedia computers behind the new SGI Indy, putting Apple among the forefront of the birth of the major industry of desktop multimedia.

Ben Thompson of Byte magazine said in September 1993 that Apple and Silicon Graphics were trailblazers by setting audio and video input as default features of those two Macintosh and of the Indy desktop PCs, which "could change the way businesspeople communicate". He said the new AV Macs had a surprising leap in features, breaking Apple's trend of slow but stable incremental technology refreshes. He tested the 840AV as the overall fastest Macintosh, attributing this to its "radically" new AV series hardware features such as dedicated DMA channels for SCSI, serial, Ethernet, and sound—but noted that the SCSI DMA performance is completely lost on the legacy architecture of System 7 pending a complete microkernel-based rewrite of the operating system such as with Pink or Copland. He tested the wealth of AV features such as telecommunications, print-to-fax, speech recognition, and video capture, and appreciated their productivity gains with surprisingly no compatibility problems.

== Timeline ==
Timeline of Macintosh Centris, LC, Performa, and Quadra models, colored by CPU type

See also: List of Mac models
