= HDI-45 connector =

Video connector by Apple Computer

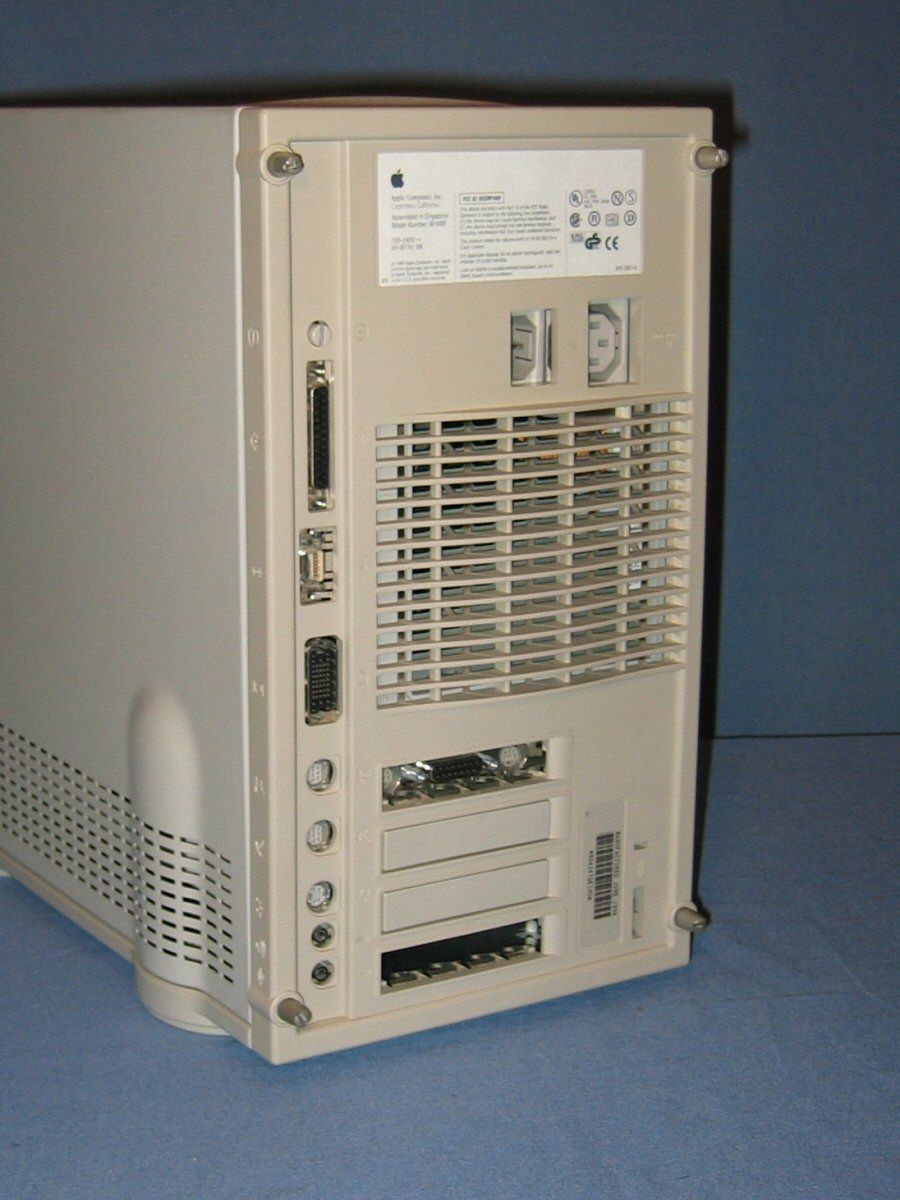
HDI-45 is the third onboard connector from the top along the left rear edge of this Power Macintosh 8100.

The HDI-45 is a proprietary 45-pin video connector developed by Apple Computer. The name HDI stands for High-Density Interconnect.

== Use ==
The HDI-45 was used on the first generation of Power Macintosh computers, including the Power Macintosh 6100, 7100, and 8100. It connected these computers to the Apple AudioVision 14 Display, the only display designed to use the connector.

Apple offered a dongle, codenamed "Canneloni" (part numbers M2681LL/A and 590-0796-A), that converted the computer's HDI-45 port to the earlier DA-15 video connector. The adapter was included with the Power Macintosh 6100.

Apple also sold a breakout adapter cable, codenamed "Calamari" (part numbers M1243LL/A and 590-0793-A), that allowed the AudioVision 14 Display to be used with computers without an HDI-45 port. The cable separated the HDI-45 connection into individual connections for DA-15 video, ADB, audio input, and audio output. It was included with the AudioVision 14 Display.

== Technical ==
In addition to carrying analog RGB video, the connector supports analog stereo audio signals (input and output), Apple Desktop Bus (ADB), and S-video input. Because the AudioVision 14 Display has front-mounted connectors for ADB and audio and video, a single consolidated cable and proprietary connector was used to simplify the connection to the computer and reduce cable clutter.

AudioVision HDI-45 pinout
Pin	Function
1	Analog audio ground
2	Audio input shield
3	Audio input (L)
4	Audio input (R)
5	Audio output (L)
6	Audio output (R)
7	Reserved
8	Monitor ID sense line 1
9	Monitor ID sense line 2
10	Video ground/shield (G)
11	Video output (G), 75Ω
12	Video input power ground
13	+5 V for camera
14	Reserved
15	Reserved
16	Reserved
17	Reserved
18	Monitor ID sense line 3
19	S-video input shield
20	S-video input, luminance (Y)
21	S-video input, chroma (C)
22	Reserved
23	Not used
24	Reserved
25	Reserved
26	Video ground/shield (R)
27	Video output (R), 75Ω
28	I^{2}C data signal
29	I^{2}C clock signal
30	Reserved
31	Monitor ID
32	Monitor ID
33	Vertical sync
34	Composite sync
35	ADB power, +5 V
36	ADB ground
37	ADB data
38	Keyboard switch
39	Reserved
40	Reserved
41	Monitor ID
42	Horizontal sync
43	Video sync ground
44	Video ground/shield (B)
45	Video output (B), 75Ω

== See also ==
- VESA Enhanced Video Connector, a similar concept to consolidate multiple cables
