= Power Macintosh 6100 =

First PowerPC-based personal computer by Apple Computer

Power Macintosh 6100 / Performa 6110 / Workgroup Server 6150
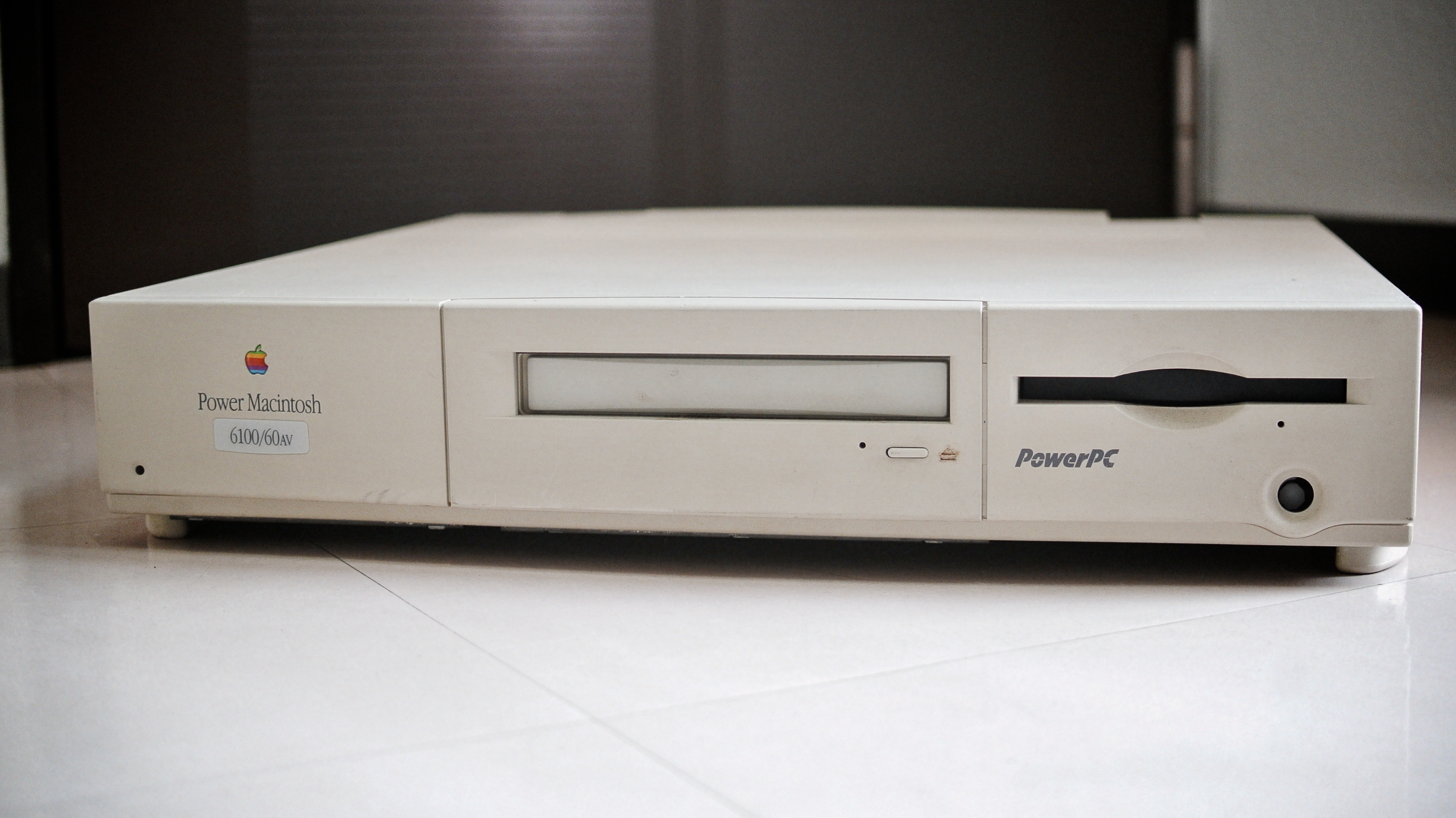
- A Power Macintosh 6100/60AV
- Also known as: "Cognac" "PDM (Piltdown Man)"
- Developer: Apple Computer
- Product family: Power Macintosh, Performa, Workgroup Server
- Type: Desktop
- Released: March 14, 1994
- Discontinued: May 18, 1996
- Operating system: System 7.1.2 – Mac OS 9.1
- CPU: PowerPC 601 @ 60–66 MHz
- Dimensions: 3.4 × 16.3 × 15.6 in (8.6 × 41.4 × 39.6 cm)
- Weight: 14 lb (6.4 kg)
- Predecessor: Macintosh Quadra 610; Macintosh Quadra 660AV
- Successor: Power Macintosh 6200
- Related: Pioneer MPC-GX1; Power Macintosh 7100; Power Macintosh 8100; Workgroup Server 9150

The Power Macintosh 6100 (also sold as the Macintosh Performa 6110 series and the Workgroup Server 6150) is a personal computer designed, manufactured, and sold by Apple Computer from March 1994 to March 1996. It was the first Macintosh to use a PowerPC processor, developed by the AIM alliance of Apple, IBM, and Motorola. The computer used a pizza-box case derived from the Centris/Quadra 610 and 660AV. It replaced the Macintosh Quadra line of computers based on the Motorola 68040.

For the consumer market, Apple sold the computer as the Macintosh Performa 6110, 6112, 6115, 6117, and 6118, with model numbers distinguishing bundled software and hard drive configurations. These configurations were bundled with an Apple Multiple Scan 15 Display and an AppleDesign Keyboard. Apple also offered the Apple Workgroup Server 6150, a server configuration that included additional server software.

The Power Macintosh 6100 was discontinued in March 1996 without a direct replacement.

== Overview ==
The 6100 was introduced alongside the Power Macintosh 7100 and Power Macintosh 8100 and occupied the entry-level role of the new Power Macintosh family.

MacWorld's review of the 6100/60 noted that "Not only has Apple finally regained the performance lead it lost about eight years ago when PCs appeared using Intel's 80386 CPU, but it has pushed far ahead." Performance of 680x0 software is slower due to the need for System 7.5's new Mac 68k emulation layer, but MacWorld's benchmarks showed noticeably faster CPU, disk, video and floating point performance than the Quadra 610 it replaced.

The 60 MHz models were upgraded to 66 MHz in January 1995. The 6100 was the slowest Power Macintosh in terms of processor speed upon introduction. Eventually, the 6100 series was able to be upgraded through third-party solutions such as Sonnet Technologies' Crescendo G3 NuBus (up to 500 MHz) and G4 NuBus (up to 360 MHz; discontinued) and Newer Technology's MaxPower G3 processor upgrades; these upgrades usually plugged into the NuBus/PDS slots of the 6100 or via the L2 cache slot (like with all other Macintoshes up until the iMac G3). These upgrades also allowed the 6100 to unofficially run up to Mac OS 9.2.2 via third-party programs such as "OS9 Helper".

Notable to this generation of machines were the new startup and "Sad Mac" chimes: instead of the electronic "chuff" that was used on the previous generation machines, it played a guitar chord strummed by jazz guitarist Stanley Jordan, and instead of the "Chimes of Death" 8-note arpeggio that played whenever there was a hardware error at startup, there was the sound of a car crashing.

Apple also released a PC-compatible model of the 6100/66 called the Power Macintosh 6100 DOS Compatible. This version came with a DOS Compatibility Card installed in the processor direct slot with an Intel 80486 DX2/66 processor (without L2 cache) and a single SIMM RAM slot that uses the same type of RAM as in the 6100 itself. The card supported up to 32 MB of RAM, a Creative Technology Sound Blaster VIBRA 16 sound chipset, and also included standard PC VGA and joystick ports. With this card, the 6100 is capable of running both the Mac OS interface and DOS/Windows 3.1 side-by-side, even on different monitors. The card could also use the main system RAM if there was no SIMM installed on the card.

This and the other NuBus-based Power Macintosh models (7100, 8100 and Workgroup Server 9150) were replaced by the Power Macintosh PCI series released in 1995, although the 6100 DOS Compatible model continued in production until 1996. By this time, Apple had already released the highly anticipated "PC Personality Card" that plugged into one of the PCI slots of the newer Power Macs, featuring a 100 MHz Pentium processor.

Early models had a CD eject button that would stick in. This was rectified on later models with a subtly re-profiled button moulding.

== Models ==
The original Power Macintosh 6100 is based on the 60 MHz PowerPC 601 processor. The base model was complemented by an AV version, which included an add-on card fitted in its Processor Direct Slot that added audio and visual enhancements such as composite and S-video input/output and full 48 kHz 16-bit DAT-resolution sound processing. A double-speed CD-ROM is included as standard.

A series of Performa models based on the 6100/60 were shipped in October 1994, collectively known as the "Performa 6100 series." All Performas included an Apple Multiple Scan 15 Display, an AppleDesign Keyboard, and a suite of pre-installed software including Quicken, MacLinkPlus, American Heritage Dictionary, and Apple's eWorld online service. CD-ROMs included with all Performas included Electronic Arts' 3D World Atlas and a variety of software for children. The Performas vary only in their hard drive size and which of two software bundles are included.

Software bundle 1: ClarisWorks, clip art collections, and Now Software's Up-To-Date and Contact.
Software bundle 2: Microsoft Works, Mavis Beacon Teaches Typing, Kid Works, Thinkin' Things, The Writing Center, Fractal Dabbler, Spaceway 2000, San Diego Zoo Presents... the Animals!, Wacky Jacks CD Gameshow.

Introduced March 14, 1994:

- Power Macintosh 6100/60
- Power Macintosh 6100/60AV

Introduced April 25, 1994:

- Apple Workgroup Server 6150

Introduced November 1, 1994:

- Macintosh Performa 6110CD: Same specifications as the 6100/60; includes System 7.5 and a 250 MB hard drive. Includes software bundle #1.
- Macintosh Performa 6112CD: Same specifications as the 6100/60; includes System 7.5 and a 250 MB hard drive. Includes software bundle #2.
- Macintosh Performa 6115CD: Same specifications as the 6100/60; includes System 7.5 and a 350 MB hard drive. Includes software bundle #1.
- Macintosh Performa 6116CD: Same specifications as the 6100/60; includes System 7.5.1 and a 700 MB hard drive
- Macintosh Performa 6117CD: Same specifications as the 6100/60; includes System 7.5.1 and a 700 MB hard drive
- Macintosh Performa 6118CD: Same specifications as the 6100/60; includes System 7.5 and a 500 MB hard drive. Includes both software bundles.

Introduced January 3, 1995:

- Power Macintosh 6100/66
- Power Macintosh 6100/66AV
- Power Macintosh 6100/66 DOS Compatible the DOS Compatibility Card occupies the PDS slot and includes a 66 MHz Intel i486DX2 processor and has a 72-pin SIMM slot which supports up to 32 MB RAM

Introduced April 3, 1995:

- Apple Workgroup Server 6150/66

Introduced July 17, 1995:

- Macintosh Performa 6116CD: Same specifications as the 6100/60; shipped with System 7.5.1 and a 350 MB hard drive

== Specifications ==
Component	Power Macintosh 6100/60	Power Macintosh 6100/66
Codename	Piltdown Man	
Processor	PowerPC 601 @ 60 MHz	PowerPC 601 @ 66 MHz
Bus speed	30 MHz	33 MHz
Data path	64 bits	
ROM	4 MB Old World ROM	
RAM	8 MB onboard; officially expandable to 72 MB, but supports up to 264 MB	
RAM expansion	Two 72-pin SIMM slots, must be installed in pairs of equal capacity; 80 ns or faster	
Level 1 cache	32 KB (16 KB instruction and 16 KB data)	
Level 2 cache	Optional	256 KB installed
Video memory	Up to 640 KB allocated from system RAM; 2 MB dedicated with the AV card	
Built-in video	Up to 640 × 480 pixels at thousands of colors or 832 × 624 pixels at 256 colors	
AV card video	Up to 1152 × 870 pixels at thousands of colors	
Expansion	One PDS slot, convertible to a 7-inch NuBus slot with an adapter	
Floppy drive	1.44 MB SuperDrive	
Optical drive	2× CD-ROM drive	
Hard drive	160–250 MB	350–500 MB
Hard drive interface	Internal SCSI	
Ethernet	AAUI-15	
ADB	One port	
Serial	Two DIN-8 GeoPort ports	
SCSI	DB-25	
Video output	HDI-45	
Audio	Stereo audio input and output; mono speaker	
Gestalt ID	75	100
Power supply	210 W	
Weight	14 lb (6.4 kg)	
Dimensions	3.4 in × 16.3 in × 15.6 in (86 mm × 414 mm × 396 mm)	
Original operating system	System 7.1.2	System 7.5
Maximum operating system	Mac OS 9.1	

Timeline of Power Macintosh models
See also: List of Mac models

Timeline of Macintosh servers
See also: List of Mac models

== In popular culture ==
A Power Macintosh 6100 appears in several episodes of the eighth season of Seinfeld in Jerry's apartment.
