= Apple displays =

Displays sold by Apple Inc.

Apple Inc. has sold a variety of LCD and CRT computer displays since introducing their first display in 1980. Apple paused production of their own standalone displays in 2016 and partnered with LG to design displays for Macs. In June 2019, the Pro Display XDR was introduced, however it was expensive and targeted for professionals. In March 2022, the Studio Display was launched as a consumer-targeted counterpart. These are currently the only Apple-branded displays available.

== CRT displays ==
Throughout the 1970s, Apple did not manufacture or sell displays, instead recommending that users connect their computers to television sets or purchase third-party monochrome monitors, which were often designed for security camera systems and relatively expensive at the time. This changed with the introduction of the Monitor III in 1981, which Apple manufactured in-house for use with the Apple III. Its introduction allowed dealers to offer complete systems. Apple later sold the Monitor II, a third-party-manufactured display rebadged for use with the Apple IIe.

=== First generation ===
Apple's manufacture history of CRT displays began in 1980, starting with the Monitor III that was introduced alongside and matched the Apple III business computer. It was a 12-inch monochrome (green) screen that could display 80×24 text characters and any type of graphics, however it suffered from a very slow phosphor refresh that resulted in a "ghosting" video effect. So it could be shared with Apple II computers, a plastic stand was made available to accommodate the larger footprint of the display.

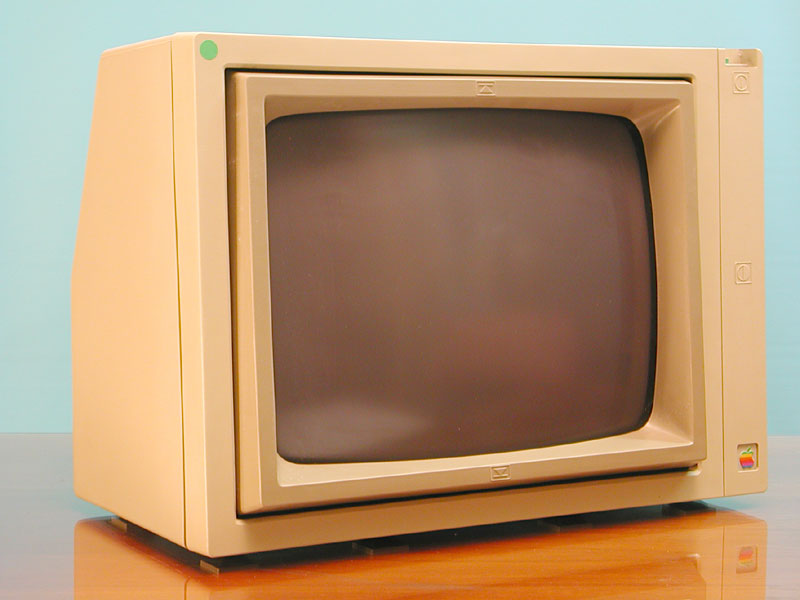
Monitor II: a monochrome CRT for the Apple II

Three years later came the introduction of the Apple manufactured Apple Monitor II, which as the name implies, was more suited in look and style for the Apple II line and at the same time added improvements in features and visual quality. In 1984, a miniature 9-inch screen, called the Monitor IIc, was introduced for the Apple IIc computer to help complement its compact size. This display was also the first to use the brand new design language for Apple's products called Snow White, as well as being the first display not in a beige color, but rather a bright, creamy off-white. By early 1985 came the first color CRTs, starting with the Monitor 100, a digital RGB display for the Apple III and Apple IIe (with appropriate card), followed shortly by the 14″ ColorMonitor IIe (later renamed to AppleColor Composite Monitor IIe) and ColorMonitor IIc (later renamed to AppleColor Composite Monitor IIc), composite video displays for those respective models. All of these Apple displays support the maximum Apple II Double Hi-Res standard of 560×192.

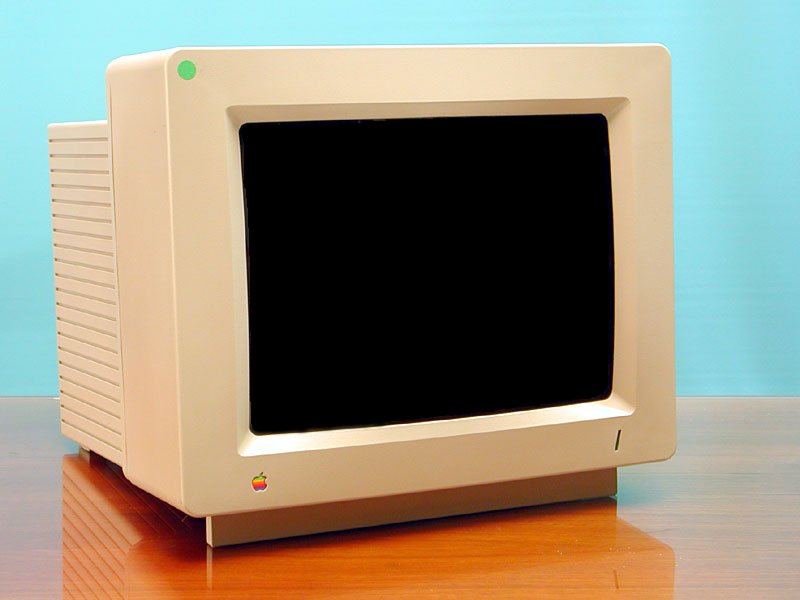
AppleColor RGB: an analog RGB display made for the Apple IIGS

In 1986 came the introduction of the AppleColor RGB Monitor, a 12″ analog RGB display designed specifically for the Apple IIGS computer. It supported a resolution of 640×400 interlaced (640×200 non-interlaced) and could be used by the Macintosh II, in a limited fashion, with the Apple High Resolution Display Video Card. Also introduced that year was the Apple Monochrome Monitor, which cosmetically was identical to the former model but was a black and white composite display suitable in external appearance for the Apple IIGS, Apple IIc or Apple IIc Plus.

=== Second generation ===
The second generation of displays were built into the Lisa and Macintosh computers. The Macintosh had a 9-inch monochrome display that could display 512×342 pixels which would be used in all monochrome Compact Macintosh computers.

In 1987, Apple released two new monitors for use with the Macintosh II. The AppleColor High-Resolution RGB Monitor had a 13″ Trinitron CRT (the first Apple display to use an aperture grille CRT) with a fixed resolution of 640×480 pixels. The Apple High-Resolution Monochrome Monitor was a 12″ CRT that supported up to 256 shades of gray at a fixed resolution of 640x480. The Macintosh II was a modular system with no internal display and was able to drive up to six displays simultaneously using multiple graphics cards. The desktop spanned multiple displays, and windows could be moved between displays or straddle them. In 1989, Apple introduced two additional monochrome displays for the Macintosh, the 20″ Macintosh Two Page Monochrome Display which could display two pages side by side and the 15″ Macintosh Portrait Display with a vertical orientation to display one page. In 1990, two 12″ displays were introduced for the low end, a 640×480 monochrome model and a 512×384 color model (560×384 for compatibility with Apple IIe Card), meant for the Macintosh LC. These were succeeded by the Macintosh Color Display series in 1992, which came in 14", 16" and 20" models, with resolutions of 640×480, 832×624, and 1152×870 respectively. There was also the Apple Performa Plus Display (a low-end Goldstar-built 14″ display with 640×480 resolution) for the Macintosh Performa series and the Apple Color Plus 14″ Display.

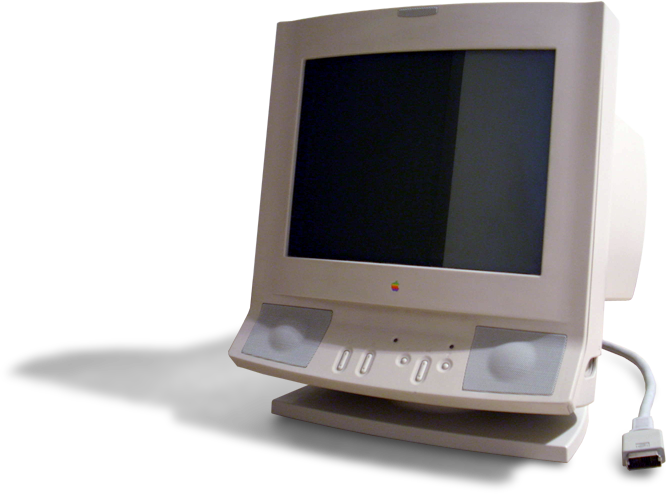
The Apple AudioVision 14 Display

=== Third generation ===
The third generation of displays marked the end of the monochrome display era and the beginning of the multimedia era. The first display to include built-in speakers was introduced in 1993 as the Apple AudioVision 14 Display. The "Multiple Scan" series of displays began with the Multiple Scan 17 and 20 with Trinitron CRTs and the Multiple Scan 14 with shadow mask CRT, and would ultimately become Apple's value line of shadow mask displays. The AppleVision series of displays then became the high-end display line, using 17″ and 20″ Trinitron CRTs and with AV versions containing integrated speakers. The AppleVision line was later renamed to "ColorSync" display line when Steve Jobs returned to Apple.

The Macintosh Color Classic introduced a 10″ color Trinitron display to the Classic compact Macintosh, with a slightly enhanced resolution of 512×384 (560×384 to accommodate the Apple IIe Card) like the standalone 12″ color display. Apple continued the all-in-one series with the larger 14″ Macintosh LC 500 series, featuring a 14″, 640×480 Trinitron CRT until the LC 580 in 1995, which heralded the switch to shadow mask CRTs for the remainder of Apple's all-in-one computers until the switch to LCDs in 2002. The last Macintosh to include an integrated CRT was the eMac, which boosted the display area to 17″ with support up to 1280×960 resolution. It used a 4th generation flat-screen CRT and was discontinued in 2006.

=== Fourth generation ===
The fourth generation of displays were introduced simultaneously with the Blue & White Power Macintosh G3 in 1999, which included the translucent plastics of the iMac (initially white and blue "blueberry", then white and grey "graphite" upon the introduction of the Power Mac G4). The displays were also designed with same translucent look. The "Apple Studio Display" series of CRT displays were available in a 17″ Diamondtron and a 21″ Trinitron CRT, both driven by an LG-Manufactured chassis. The 17″ displays were notorious for faulty flybacks and failing in a manner that could destroy the monitor and catch fire. It's also reported that these monitors can destroy GPUs, and sometimes the entire computer. The last Apple external CRT display was introduced in 2000 along with the Power Mac G4 Cube. Both it and the new "LCD Studio Displays" featured clear plastics to match the Cube, and the new Apple Display Connector, which provided power, USB, and video signals to the display through a single cable. It was available only in a 17″ flat screen Diamondtron CRT. It was discontinued the following year.

== Flat panel displays ==
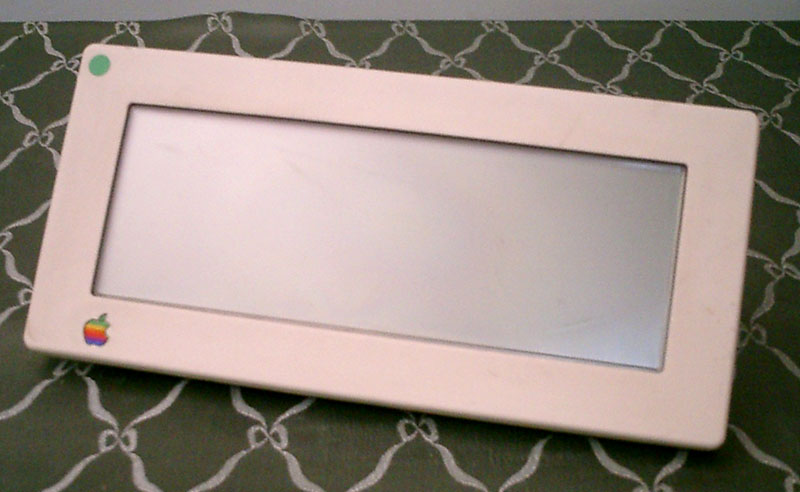
The Apple Flat Panel Display for the Apple IIc, a very early LCD

The history of Apple LCDs started in 1984 when the Apple Flat Panel Display was introduced for the Apple IIc computer, principally to enhance the IIc's portability (see Apple IIc Portability enhancements). This monochrome display was capable of 80 columns by 24 lines, as well as double hi-res graphics, but had an odd aspect ratio (making images look vertically squished) and required a very strong external light source, such as a desk lamp or direct sunlight to be used. Even then it had a very poor contrast overall and was quite expensive (US$600), contributing to its poor sales and consequently it dropping from the market not long after its introduction. An estimated 10,000 IIc LCDs were produced.

=== Portable displays ===
The next attempt at a flat panel was with the Macintosh Portable. More of a "luggable" than a laptop, it contained a high-resolution, active-matrix, 1-bit black & white, 9.8″ LCD with 640×400 resolution. Like the IIc Flat Panel, it was not backlit and required a bright light source to be used. A second generation model employed a backlit LCD. The PowerBook and MacBook series would continue to use LCDs, following an industry-wide evolution from black-and-white to grayscale to color and ranging from 9″ to 17″. Two primary technologies were used, active matrix (higher quality and more expensive) and passive matrix displays (lower quality and cheaper). By 1998 all laptops would use active-matrix color LCDs, though the Newton products and eMate portables would continue to use black and white LCDs. Apple's current MacBook portable displays include LED backlighting and support either 2560×1600 or 2880×1800 pixel resolutions depending on screen size. The iPod series used black-and-white or color LCDs, the iPhone line uses LCD and OLED displays, and the Apple Watch uses OLED.

=== All-In-Ones ===
In 1997, Apple released the Twentieth Anniversary Macintosh (TAM), its first all-in-one desktop with an LCD. Drawing heavily from PowerBook technology, the TAM featured a 12.1″ active matrix LCD capable of displaying up to 16 bit color at 800×600. While Apple chose to retain traditional and cheaper CRTs for its all-in-one desktop line for the next 4 years, the TAM is undoubtedly the predecessor for the successful LCD-based iMac line of all-in-one desktops starting with the iMac G4 released in 2002. A substantial upgrade over the TAM, it contained a 15″ LCD supporting up to 1024×768 resolution. It was followed by a 17″ and 20″ models boasting resolution of up to 1680 × 1050. In 2005, the iMac G5 dropped the 15″ configuration and in 2007, the new iMac dropped the 17″ and added a 24″ to the line-up, further boosting resolution to 1920 x 1200. In October 2009, new iMac models moved to 16:9 aspect ratio screens at 21.5 and 27 inches.

=== External displays ===
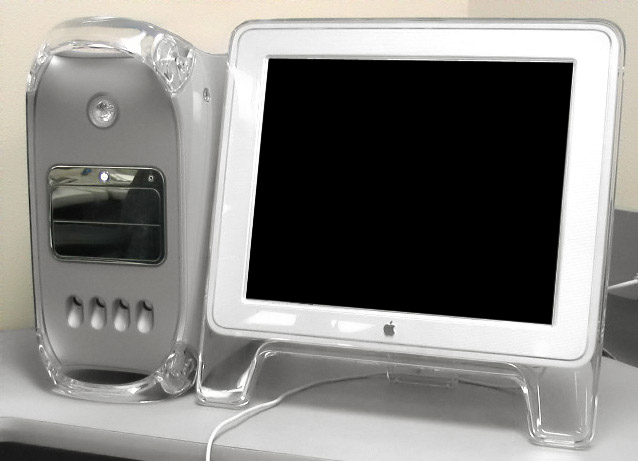
A Power Mac G4 and an LCD-based Studio Display

The first desktop color flat-panel was introduced on March 17, 1998, with the 15″ Apple Studio Display (15-inch flat panel) which had a resolution of 1024×768. After the eMate, it was one of the first Apple products to feature translucent plastics, two months before the unveiling of the iMac. Apple called its dark blue color "azul". It had a DA-15 input as well as S-video, composite video, ADB and audio connectors, though no onboard speakers. In January 1999 the coloring was changed to match the blue and white of the new Power Macintosh G3s, and the connector changed to DE-15 VGA.

The 22″ widescreen Apple Cinema Display was introduced in August 1999, simultaneously with the Power Mac G4 and in the beginning was sold only as an option to the Power Mac G4, selling for US$3,999. It had a native resolution of 1600×1024 and used a DVI connector. The display had a striped look on the bezel, similar to previous Studio Displays and iMacs. In December, the colors of the 15″ display were changed to "graphite" to match the new Power Mac G4s, and the input was changed from VGA to DVI, the audio and video features dropped, and the ADB functionality replaced by a two-port USB hub.

In 2000 the 22″ Cinema Displays switched to the ADC interface, and the 15″ Studio Display was remodeled to match the Cinema Display's easel-like form factor and also featured the Apple Display Connector. In 2001 an LCD-based 17″ Studio Display was introduced, with a resolution of 1280×1024.

In 2002 Apple introduced the Cinema Display HD which had a 23″ widescreen display with a resolution of 1920×1200. In 2003 Apple introduced the 20″ Cinema Display with a resolution of 1680×1050 to replace the discontinued 22″ display.

In 2004 a new line was introduced, utilizing the same 20″ and 23″ panels alongside a new 30″ model, for $3,299. The displays had a sleek aluminum enclosure with a much narrower bezel than their predecessors. The 20″ model featured a 1680×1050 resolution, the 23″ 1920×1200, and the 30″ 2560×1600. The 30″ version requires a dual-link interface, because a single-link DVI connection (the most common type) doesn't have enough bandwidth to provide a picture to a display of this resolution. Initially, the only graphics cards that could power the new 30″ display were the Nvidia GeForce 6800 DDL series, available in both GT and Ultra forms. The DDL suffix signified the dual-link DVI capability. The less expensive of the two cards retailed for US$499, raising the net cost of owning and using the display to nearly $3,800. Later graphics options included Nvidia's Quadro FX 4500; the card included two dual-link DVI connectors which allowed a Power Mac G5 to run two 30″ Cinema Displays simultaneously with the total number of pixels working out to 8.2 million.

In 2006 along with the introduction of the Mac Pro, Apple lowered the price of the 30″ Cinema Display to US$1999. The Mac Pro featured an Nvidia GeForce 7300GT as the graphics card in its base configuration which is capable of running a 30″ Cinema Display and another 23″ display simultaneously. The original Mac Pro was also available with both ATI's Radeon X1900XT card and Nvidia's Quadro FX 4500 as build-to-order options. The X1900XT and FX 4500 are each capable of driving two 30″ Cinema Displays.

=== LED Cinema Display ===
With the introduction of the Unibody MacBook family, Apple introduced the 24-inch LED Cinema Display, its first desktop display to use the new Mini DisplayPort connector, and also the first with an LED-backlit LCD. It had built-in speakers, a powered 3-port USB hub on the rear, an iSight camera and microphone, and a MagSafe power adapter for laptops. It also connected by USB for peripherals. It has a resolution of 1920×1200 and retailed for US$899.00. In 2010 it was replaced with a new 27-inch version with a resolution of 2560×1440.

=== Thunderbolt Display ===
In 2011 Apple released the Apple Thunderbolt Display, replacing the Mini DisplayPort and USB connector with a Thunderbolt plug for display and data. A Gigabit Ethernet port, a FireWire 800 port and a Thunderbolt 2 port were added as well, and the iSight camera was upgraded with a 720p FaceTime camera. On June 23, 2016, Apple announced it had discontinued the Thunderbolt Display, ending Apple's production of standalone displays.

=== LG UltraFine ===
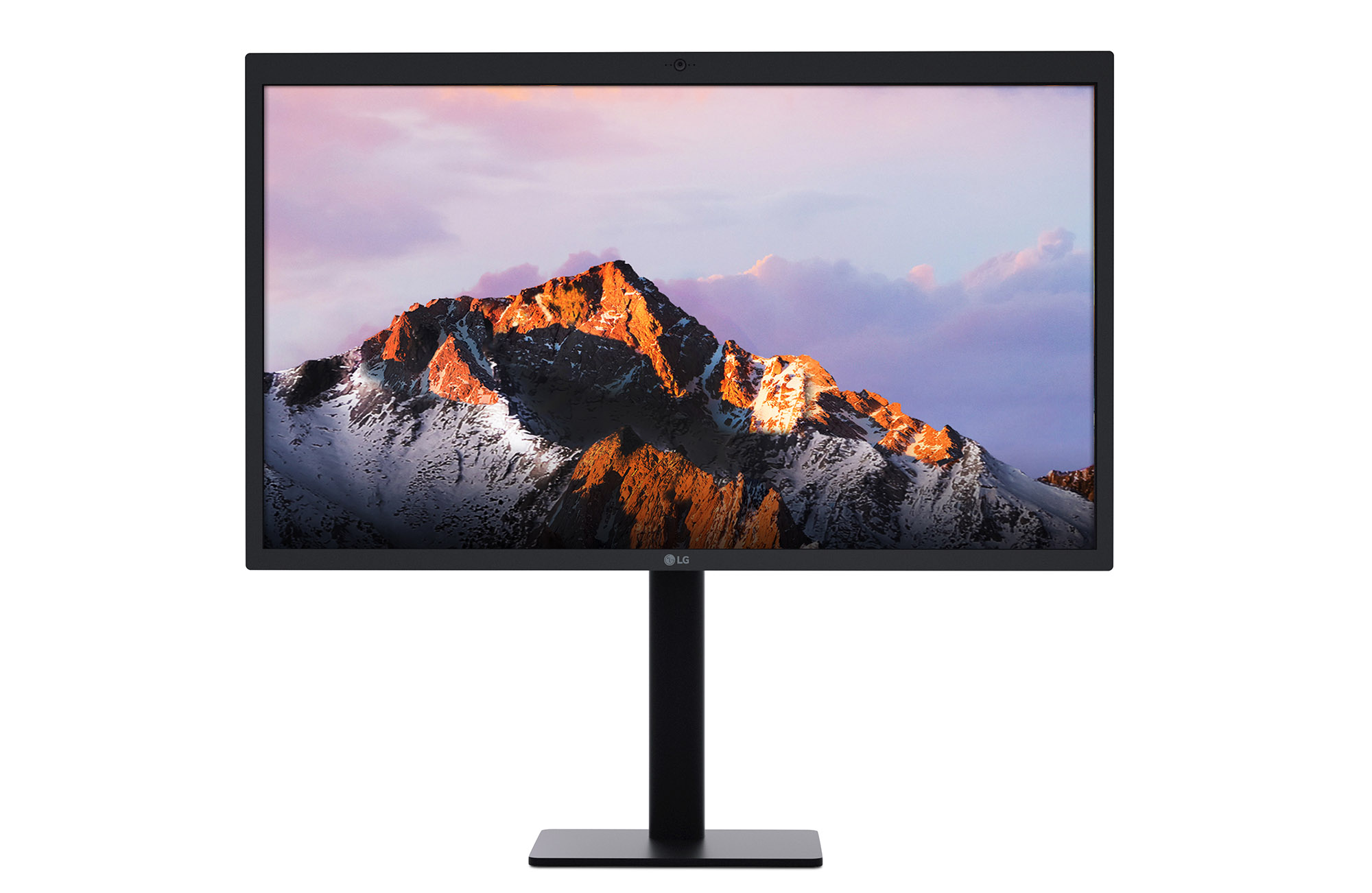
The LG UltraFine 5K Display

After Apple discontinued production of standalone displays in 2016, they partnered with LG to design the UltraFine line, with a 21.5-inch 4096x2304 display (22MD4KA-B) and 27-inch 5120x2880 display (27MD5KA-B), released in November 2016 alongside the Thunderbolt 3-enabled MacBook Pro. Both displays use a USB-C connector, with the 27-inch version integrating Thunderbolt 3 connectivity. On the rear of the displays is a three port USB-C hub. The 21.5-inch version provides up to 60W charging power, while the 27-inch provides up to 85W. The 21.5-inch is compatible with all Macs with a USB-C port, while the 27-inch version can only be used natively at full resolution with Macs with Thunderbolt 3, which includes all Macs with USB-C except the Retina MacBook. The 27-inch model is compatible with older Thunderbolt 2-equipped Macs using an adapter, but is limited to displaying their maximum output resolution. Both models include integrated stereo speakers, while the 27-inch model also includes a 1080p FaceTime-compatible camera. Like previous Apple displays, there are no physical buttons on the display, and brightness and speaker volume are controlled by a connected computer.

Reviews of the UltraFine displays praised their image and sound quality and macOS integration, but criticized their design, build quality, and lack of cable management and USB-A ports. LG acknowledged that early production 5K models lacked shielding for radio interference and could become inoperable if placed near a wireless router and introduced a repair program.

In May 2019, the 21.5-inch model was discontinued and replaced with a 23.7-inch 3840x2160 model (24MD4KL-B) which added Thunderbolt 3 connectivity, auto-brightness, and increased the power output to 85W for laptops. In July 2019, the 27-inch model (27MD5KL-B, 27MD5KB-B) was updated with USB-C video input, adding compatibility with the 3rd generation iPad Pro at 4K resolution, auto-brightness, and increased power output to 94W for laptops. Apple stopped selling the displays in March 2022 following the release of the Apple Studio Display, but the displays are still in production and sold by LG.

=== Pro Display XDR ===
Apple announced the Pro Display XDR at the 2019 WWDC, the first Apple-branded display since the Apple Thunderbolt Display was discontinued in 2016. The display contains a 6016×3384 6K color-calibrated Extreme Dynamic Range (XDR) panel. The Pro Display XDR was discontinued in March 2026 in favour of the new Studio Display XDR.

=== Studio Display ===
Apple announced the Apple Studio Display at the March 2022 Apple Special Event. It features a 27-inch, 5K Retina monitor, with 5120-by-2880 resolution at 218 pixels per inch, 600 nits brightness, wide color (P3), and True Tone technology.

=== Studio Display XDR ===
Apple announced the Apple Studio Display XDR in March 2026. It features a 27-inch, 5K Retina XDR display, with 5120-by-2880 resolution at 218 pixels per inch and True Tone technology. Compared to the Studio Display, the Studio Display XDR adds a 120Hz refresh rate with adaptive sync, mini-LED backlighting, and P3 + Adobe RGB wide color gamut. It has up to 1000 nits SDR brightness and 2000 nits peak HDR brightness.

== Connectors ==
Apple has employed a large number of display connector designs over the years:

- DA-15 (commonly but incorrectly known as a DB-15) – used on most modular desktop computers from the 1986 Apple IIGS until the 1999 Blue and White Power Macintosh G3.
- DB13W3 – used on the Macintosh Portrait Display
- "Mini-15" – non-standard connector used on early PowerBooks to allow an Apple display to be attached via a short adaptor cable (dongle)
- HDI-45 – used on some "AV" model Centris, Quadra and the first-generation (NuBus) Power Macintosh machines.
- VGA (15-pin high-density DE-15) – first included on some Power Macintosh 9600 models and most PowerPC PowerBooks
- Apple Display Connector (ADC) – used on the PowerMac G4 and early models of the PowerMac G5, carries DVI, VGA, USB and power in one connector
- DVI – used on the 2001-2002 titanium PowerBook G4; all aluminum PowerBook G4 15″ and 17″; all aluminum MacBook Pro 15″ and 17″ models; Mac Mini G4, Power Mac G4, G5; Intel Mac Mini, and Mac Pro 2006–2012
- Mini-VGA – used on the white iBook, eMac, iMac G4 and G5, and first generation 12-inch PowerBook G4, later models also support composite and S-video dongles attached to this port
- Mini-DVI – used on the 12″ PowerBook G4 (except first generation), Intel-based iMacs, MacBooks, and Mac Minis
- Micro-DVI – used in the first generation MacBook Air
- Mini DisplayPort – used on some MacBook Air, MacBook Pro, iMac, Mac Mini and Mac Pro models
- Thunderbolt via USB-C – used on all Macs since the 12-inch MacBook, compatible with HDMI and DisplayPort

Additionally, various Apple computers have been able to output:

- S-video via standard 4-pin mini-DIN connector
- Composite video, via:
  - S-video port (PowerBooks)
  - Standard RCA connector (AV Macs)
  - RCA connector video out on the Apple II, II Plus, IIe, IIc, IIc Plus, IIGS, III, and III Plus. While not technically NTSC or PAL compatible, a suitable image would display on NTSC/PAL television monitors
  - A non-standard 3.5 mm jack that functions as either a headphone jack, or stereo audio and composite video out via an adaptor cable (FireWire Special Edition Clamshell iBooks and early "Dual USB" iBooks with external reset button)
- S-video, Composite video, or VGA, via:
  - Mini-VGA when using an Apple Video Output Adapter (S-video & Composite or VGA)
- The Apple Video Adapter was specially designed to allow users to connect to S-video or composite video devices. The video adapter cable plugs into the video output port (Mini-VGA) built into the back of certain Macintosh computers. The video output port supports VGA, S-Video and Composite video out. The Apple Video Adapter is for S-Video or Composite video output only, use a separate Apple VGA Adapter for VGA video output options. With the Apple Video Adapter you can connect to your TV, VCR, or overhead projector via S-Video or Composite cables.

Compatible with: iBook without an external reset button, 12-inch PowerBook G4, Mac Mini, eMac, iMac G5, or 17-inch iMac (1 GHz) with Mini-VGA port.

- The Apple VGA Display Adapter was specially designed to allow users to connect certain Macintosh computers to an extra VGA display or external projector (equipped with VGA) for 24-bit video-mirroring. The VGA cable from your external display or projector cable plugs into the Mini-VGA video port built into your Macintosh via the Apple VGA Display Adapter.

Compatible with: eMac, iMac G5, iMac G4 flat-panel, 12-inch PowerBook G4, or iBooks having a Mini-VGA port. Most Macintosh computers with the Mini-VGA port can also use the Apple Video Adapter for S-video & Composite output options.

- 12-inch PowerBook G4 (first generation) models supported video-mirroring and extended video desktop modes through a mini-VGA port. All 15 and 17 inch PowerBook G4 models have a DVI port as well as an S-Video out port. The mini-VGA port on the 12-inch PowerBook was replaced by a mini-DVI port starting with the second revision of the machine.
- The Retina MacBook Pro supports HDMI output from a built-in connector in addition to its two Thunderbolt connectors.
