= Macintosh Quadra 660AV =

Personal computer by Apple Computer

Centris 660AV / Quadra 660AV
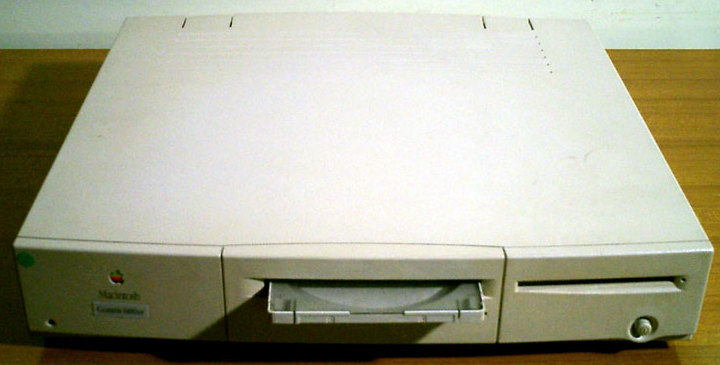
- A Macintosh Centris 660AV
- Also known as: "Tempest"
- Developer: Apple Computer
- Product family: Centris, Quadra
- Released: July 29, 1993
- Introductory price: US$2,300 (equivalent to $5,126 in 2025)
- Discontinued: September 12, 1994
- Operating system: System 7.1 – Mac OS 8.1; With PowerPC upgrade Mac OS 9.1
- CPU: Motorola 68040 @ 25 MHz
- Memory: 8 MB, expandable to 68 MB (60 ns 72-pin SIMM)
- Successor: Macintosh Quadra 630; Power Macintosh 6100/60AV
- Related: Macintosh Quadra 840AV

The Macintosh Quadra 660AV, originally sold as the Macintosh Centris 660AV, is a personal computer designed, manufactured and sold by Apple Computer from July 1993 to September 1994. It was introduced alongside the Quadra 840AV; the "AV" after both model numbers signifies video input and output capabilities and enhanced audio. It was rebranded from Centris to Quadra in September 1993 without any actual internal changes.

The 660AV was discontinued a few months after the introduction of the Power Macintosh 6100/60AV. Apple sold a Power Macintosh Upgrade Card that upgrades the 660AV to match the 6100/60AV's specifications for US$1,399. This and the Quadra 630 were positioned for users who were not ready to move to PowerPC.

== Hardware ==
The 660AV uses the pizza box form factor of the earlier Centris 610. The 660AV has a full Motorola 68040 instead of the 610's FPU-less 68LC040. Thanks to the SCSI direct-memory access chip and the SCSI Manager software, the 660AV outperformed the discontinued Quadra 700 (sharing the same 25 MHz 68040) and managed to match the Quadra 950 (despite having the faster 33 MHz 68040) in a few tests.

Like the 840AV, the 660AV features video input/output capability and an onboard AT&T 3210 digital signal processor (here clocked at 55 MHz, compared to the faster variant in the 840AV clocked at 66.7 MHz) to make the video handling less of a burden on the CPU.

The 660AV is the first Macintosh to include GeoPort; an optional GeoPort Telecom Adapter enables fax and modem capabilities.

Some of the earliest Centris 660AVs have the older auto-inject floppy drive opening similar to the 610, but most of the Centris models and all of the Quadra models have a drive similar to the Power Macintosh 6100, lacking the auto-inject feature. These models have a deep round indentation at the center of the floppy drive slot to make it possible to fully insert the disk.

The Quadra AV Macs introduced a new universal ROM (codenamed SuperMario) that would later be used in all PowerPC systems. It includes SCSI Manager 4.3 and Sound Manager 3.0. It also is "vectorized", making it easier to patch.

=== Models ===
Introduced July 29, 1993:

- Macintosh Centris 660AV

Introduced October 21, 1993:

- Macintosh Quadra 660AV

== Reception ==
Jonathan Chevreau of the National Post said on August 7, 1993, that the Quadra 840AV and Centris 660AV were the next most interesting multimedia computers behind the new SGI Indy, putting Apple among the forefront of the birth of the major industry of desktop multimedia. Byte magazine said in September 1993 that Apple and Silicon Graphics were trailblazers by setting audio and video input as default features of these two Macintosh and of the Indy desktop PCs, which "could change the way businesspeople communicate".

Timeline of Macintosh Centris, LC, Performa, and Quadra models, colored by CPU type

See also: List of Mac models
