= Apple Monitor II =

Monochrome computer monitor

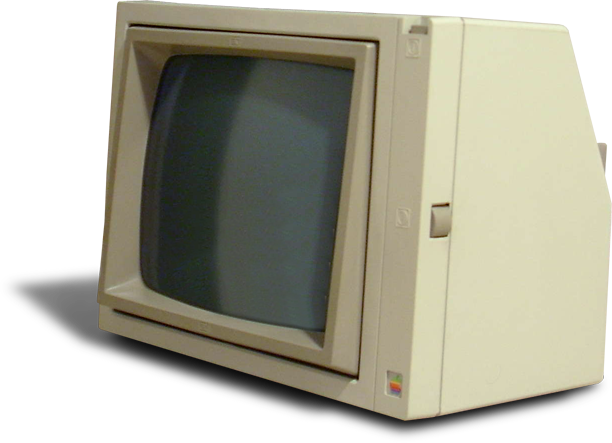
- Manufacturer: Sanyo
- Type: Monochrome CRT
- Released: 1983
- Introductory price: US$229 (equivalent to $740 in 2025)
- Discontinued: November 1993
- Dimensions: 12-inch screen
- Weight: 8.5 kg (19 lb)

The Apple Monitor II is a CRT-based green monochrome 12-inch monitor manufactured by Sanyo for Apple Computer; for the Apple II. Apple introduced the monitor halfway through the lifespan of the II series. The business-oriented Apple III has the Apple Monitor III, released long before. Many home users of Apple II computers used televisions as computer monitors before the Monitor II. It has an inner vertical-swiveling frame. This allows users to adjust the viewing angle up or down without the addition of a tilt-and-swivel device. The Monitor II was widely adjustable for the time, including adjustments for the size and location of the image on the screen. These adjustments have a very small influence on the picture. The Monitor II was designed for the Apple II+, but was used widely throughout the Apple II product line, most commonly on the Apple IIe.
