= Apple Monitor III =

Monochrome computer monitor from Apple Computer, Inc

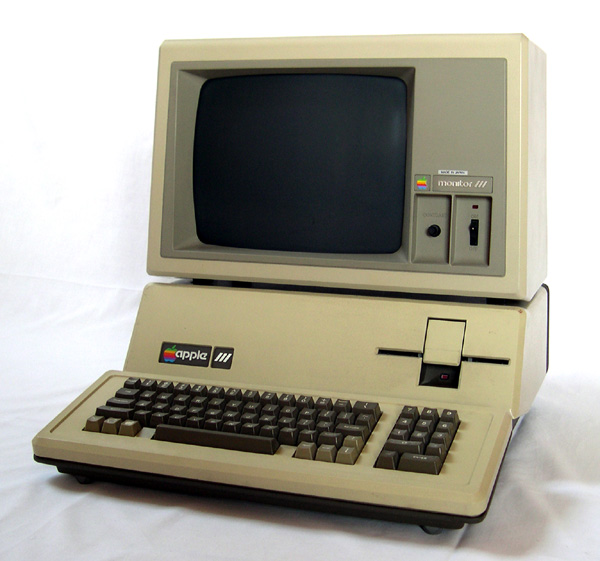
- Type: Green or white phosphor CRT monochrome monitor
- Released: November 1, 1980
- Discontinued: October 1, 1985
- Dimensions: 12-inch screen

The Apple Monitor III (stylized monitor ///) is a 12-inch green phosphor (A3M0039) or white phosphor (A3M0006) CRT-based monochrome monitor manufactured by Sanyo and later Hitachi for Apple Computer; for the Apple III personal computer, introduced in 1980. As Apple's first monitor in their business line of machines, it preceded the Apple Monitor II by several years. The Apple Monitor III's main feature was the fine mesh on the CRT to reduce glare. It was also notable for having a very slow phosphor refresh, which adversely created a ghosting effect with any video movement. The Apple Monitor III was also compatible with the entire Apple II series and numerous other computers through its standard composite video input jack.

A monitor stand for the Monitor III was available from Apple, to accommodate the narrower width of the Apple II case.
