= Computer tower =

Computer case that stands vertically upright

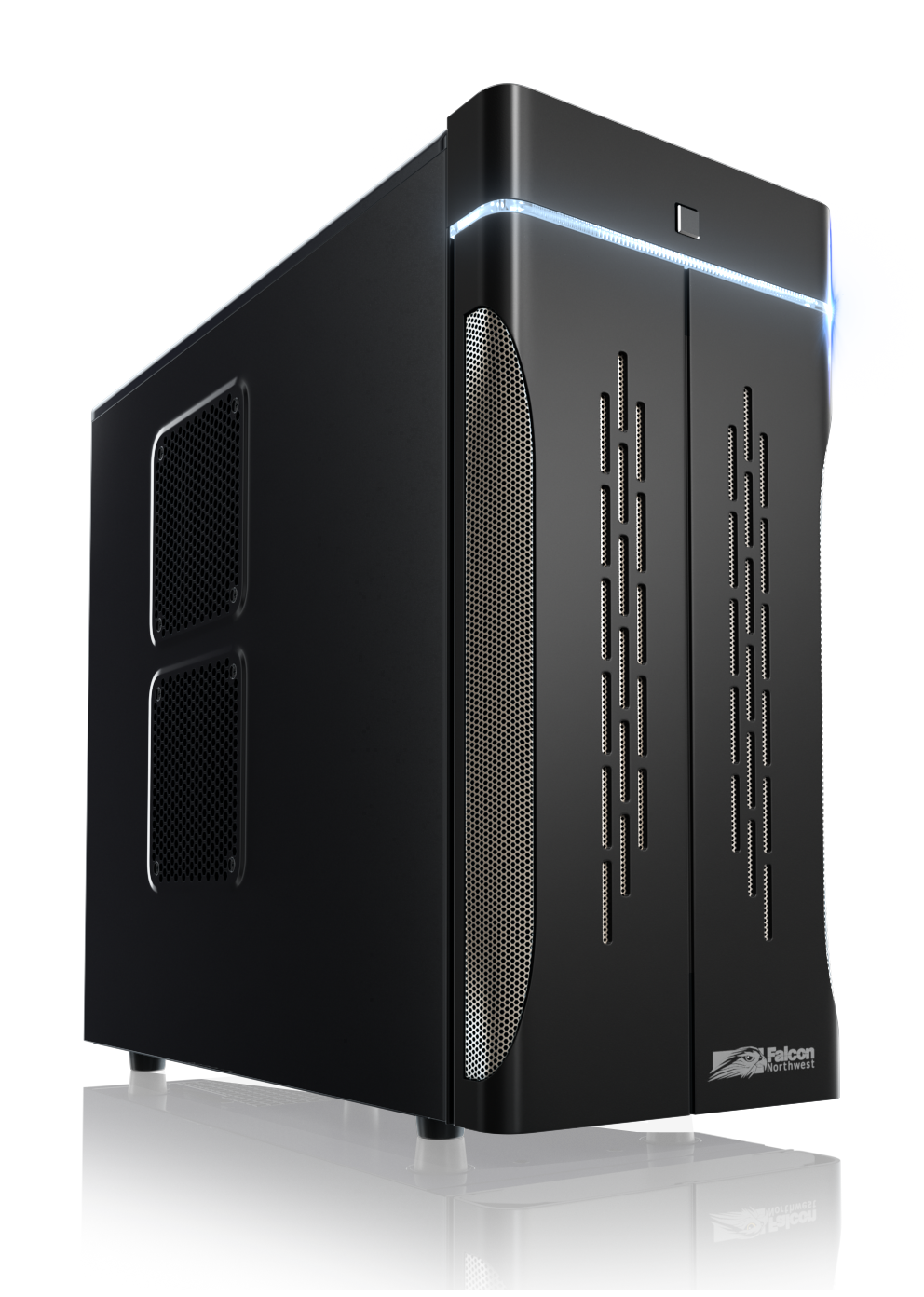
A mid-tower computer case from c. 2011

In personal computing, a tower unit, or simply a tower, is a form factor of desktop computer case whose height is much greater than its width, thus having the appearance of an upstanding tower block, as opposed to a traditional "pizza box" computer case whose width is greater than its height and appears lying flat.

Compared to a pizza box case, the tower tends to be larger and offers more potential for internal volume for the same desk area occupied, and therefore allows more hardware installation and theoretically better airflow for cooling. Multiple size subclasses of the tower form factor have been established to differentiate their varying sizes, including full-tower, mid-tower, midi-tower, mini-tower, and deskside; these classifications are however nebulously defined and inconsistently applied by different manufacturers.

Although the traditional layout for a tower system is to have the case placed on top of the desk alongside the monitor and other peripherals, a far more common configuration is to place the case on the floor below the desk or in an under-desk compartment, in order to free up desktop space for other items. Computer systems housed in the horizontal "pizza box" form factor—once popularized by the IBM PC in the 1980s but fallen out of mass use since the late 1990s—have been given the term desktops to contrast them with towers that are often situated under the desk.

== Subclasses ==
Tower cases are often categorized as mini-tower, midi-tower, mid-tower, full-tower, and deskside. The terms are subjective and inconsistently defined by different manufacturers.

=== Full-tower ===
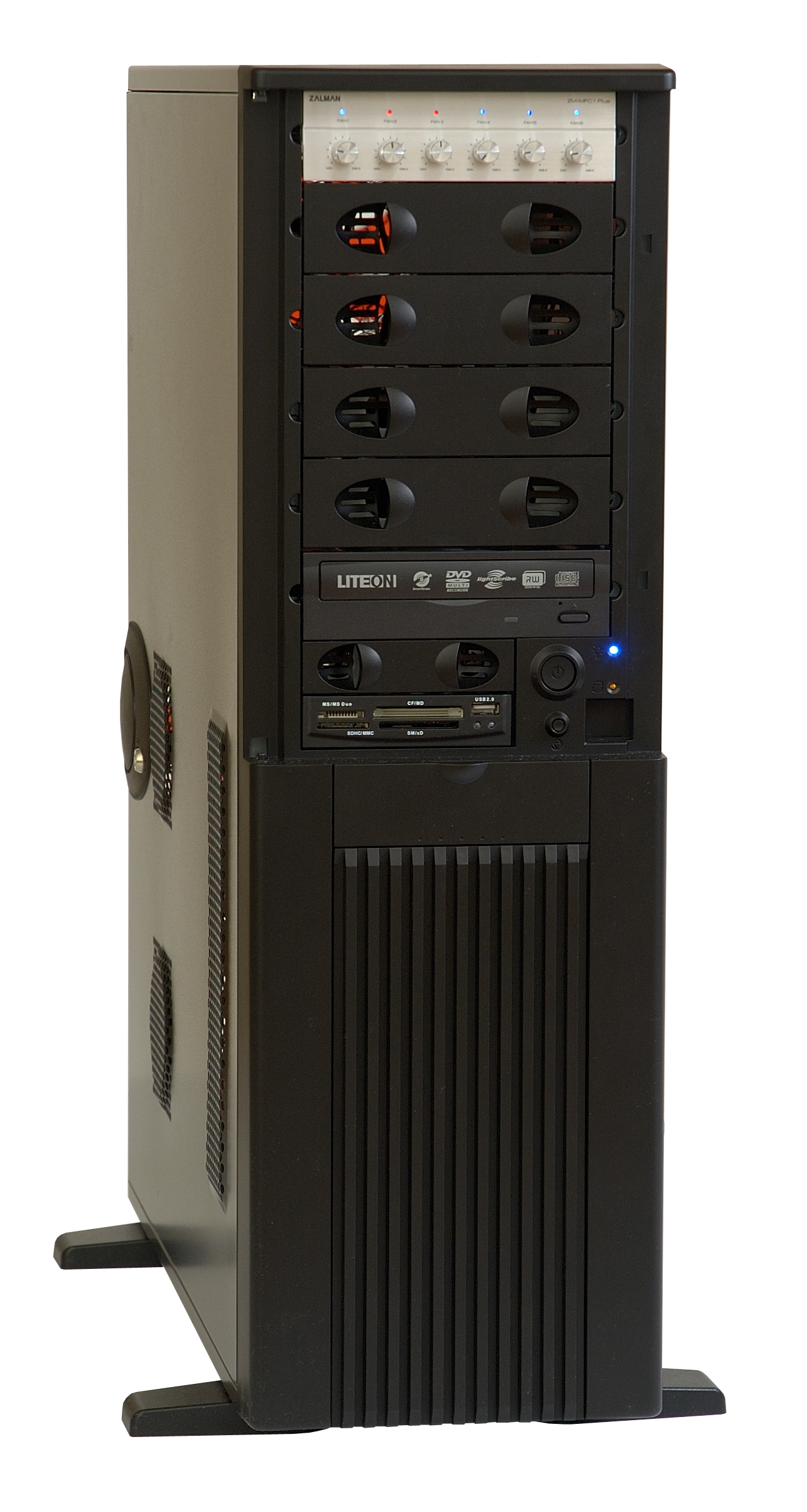
A full-tower computer case from c. 2010

Full-tower cases, typically 20 inches (51 cm) or more in height, are designed for maximum scalability. For case modding enthusiasts and gamers wanting to play the most technically challenging video games, the full-tower case also makes for an ideal gaming PC case because of their ability to accommodate extensive water cooling setups and larger case fans. Traditionally, full-tower systems had between four and six externally accessible half-height 5.25-inch drive bays and up to ten 3.5-inch drive bays. Some full-tower cases included locking side-doors and other physical security features to prevent theft of the discs inside those bays. However, as modern computing technology has moved away from mechanical hard drives and optical drives toward solid-state devices such as USB flash drives, solid-state drives (SSDs), large-capacity external storage, and cloud storage, such an abundance of internal and external drive bays is less common. More recent full-tower cases instead only have one or two external drive bays, or none at all, with the internal bays moved elsewhere in the case to free up room and improve airflow.

Full-tower cases readily fit full-size ATX motherboards but may also accommodate smaller microATX motherboards due to the former standard's interoperability in mounting holes. Full-tower cases may also have increased dimensional depth and length over their shorter counterparts, allowing them to accommodate Extended ATX motherboards, larger graphics cards and heat sinks. Since the 2010s, full-tower cases are commonly used by enthusiasts as showpiece cases with custom water cooling, RGB LED lighting, and tempered glass or acrylics side panel. They may also hold two motherboards (as is the case with the Corsair 1000D) and dual power supplies (Corsair 900D).

=== Mid-tower ===
Mid-tower cases, usually between 16 inches (41 cm) and 20 inches (51 cm) in height, are the most common form factor of personal computer towers. Before the late 2010s, mid-towers contained between three and four 5.25-inch drive bays and an equivalent number of 3.5-inch bays to house optical disc drives, floppy disk drives and hard disk drives, leaving just enough room for a standard ATX motherboard and power supply unit. Since the widespread adoption of USB flash drives, solid-state drives (which take up far less space than spinning hard disk drives) and the declining usage of internal optical drives, the number of drive bays has become less of a concern to the contemporary computer user, the internal space of mid-towers is now used more commonly for closed-loop water coolers, dual graphics cards, and tightly stacked SSDs.

=== Midi-tower ===
The marketing term midi-tower sometimes refers to cases smaller than a mid-tower but still larger than a mini-tower (see below), typically with two to three external bays. Other times the term may be synonymous with mid-tower.

=== Mini-tower ===
Mini-tower cases, between 12 inches (30 cm) and 16 inches (41 cm) in height, slot between the Mini-ITX specification for small-form-factor PCs and the archetypal mid-tower. Mini-towers typically will only accommodate microATX motherboards and for this reason sell in fewer numbers in the consumer market than the other size classes of computer towers. Traditionally, mini-towers had only one or two disk drive bays (either 5.25-inch or 3.5-inch).

=== Deskside ===
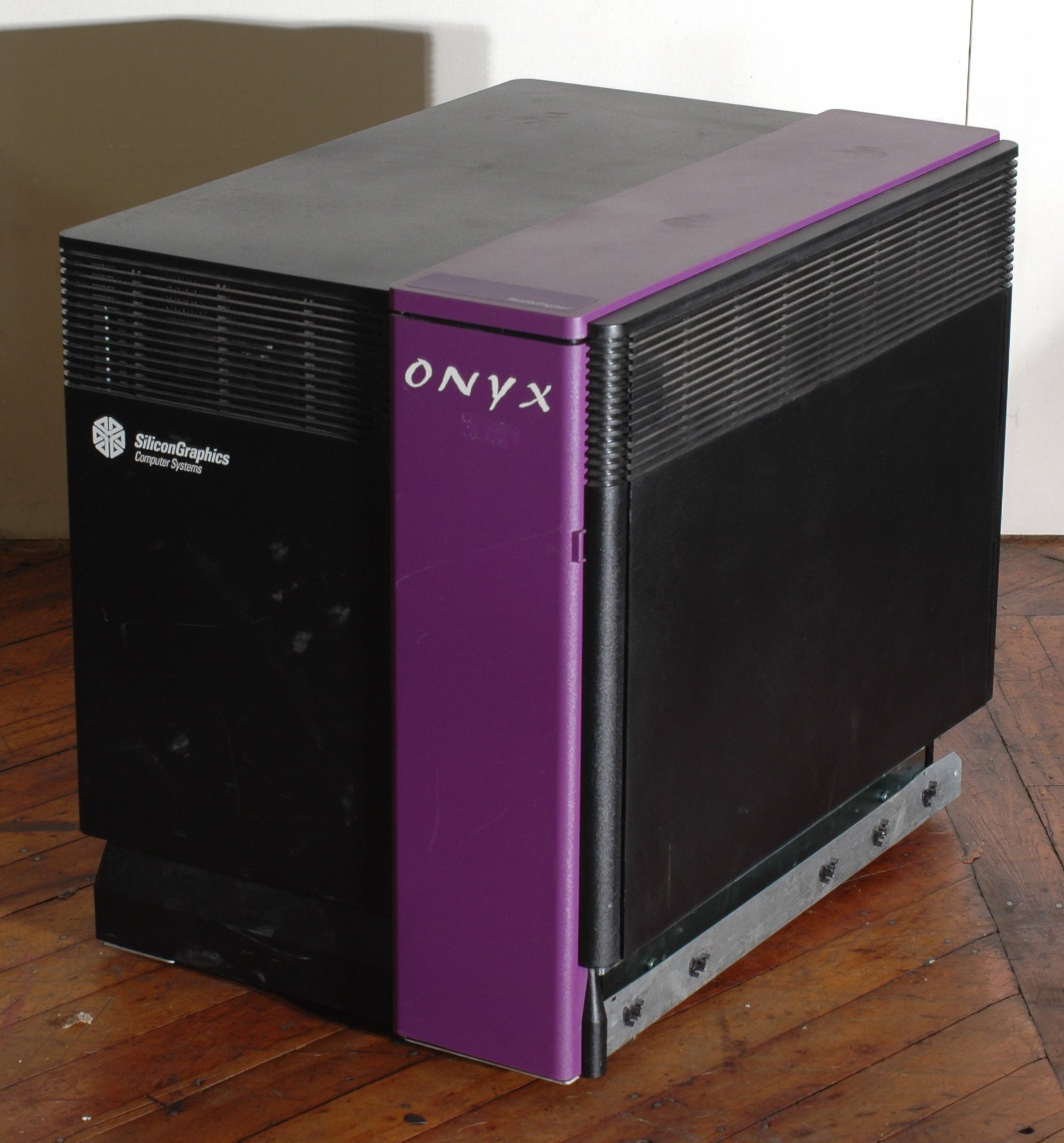
An SGI Onyx deskside computer

The term deskside is primarily a term of art in the workstation market, referring to computer towers with a much wider footprint than traditional domestic tower units. These wider deskside cases accommodate a far greater amount of central processing units (CPUs), drive bays, memory slots, expansion slots, peripherals, and I/O adapters, among other devices.

== History ==
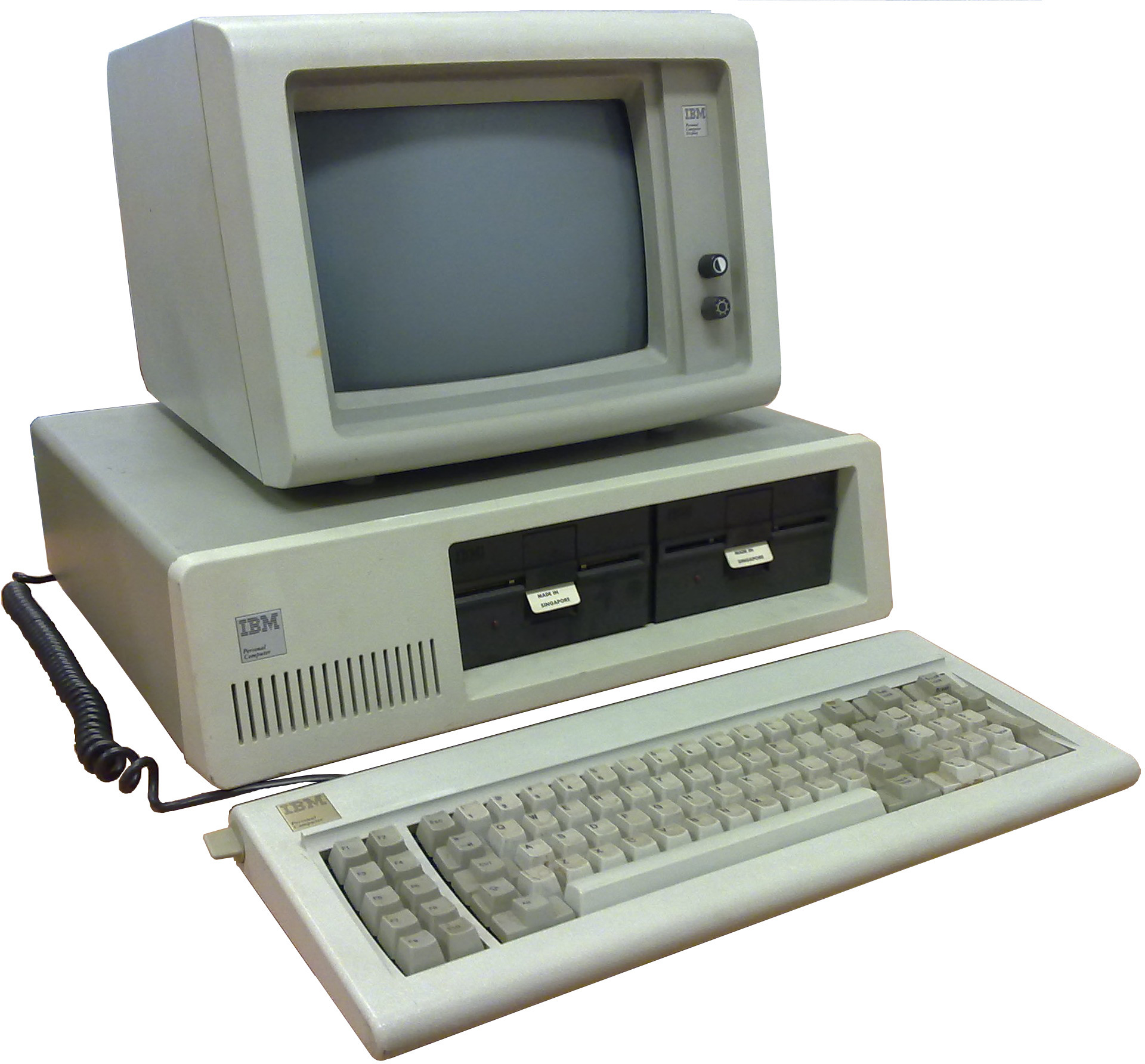
The horizontally configured system unit of the original IBM PC set a de facto standard for the physical setup of personal computers from the early 1980s to the mid-1990s.

The tower form factor may be seen as a proportional miniaturization of mainframe computers and minicomputers, some of which comprise massive tall enclosures standing almost to the ceiling. In the advent of the microcomputer era, most systems were configured with the keyboard built into the same chassis that the main system circuit board resides. Such computers were also termed home computers and counted such popular systems as the Apple II, TRS-80, VIC-20, and Commodore 64, among others. In 1981, IBM introduced the IBM Personal Computer, a system which was met widespread adoption in both enterprises and home businesses within a couple years and set a new de facto standard for the physical configuration of microcomputers. The IBM PC and successors housed the system board and expansion cards in a separate horizontal unit, with the keyboard usually in front and the prescribed CRT monitor resting on top of the system unit; the front of the system unit houses one or more disk drives.

In 1982, NCR introduced the Tower series of workstation computers, named so for their tall, upright configuration, intended to be stowed away under a desk. The first, the Tower 1632, is 29 inches tall and featured a Motorola 68000 microprocessor. Costing upwards of $12,500, the 1632 is meant to run Unix and supports up to 16 simultaneous networked users. NCR continued adding to the Tower line into the late 1980s.

In 1983, Tandy Corporation offered their Tandy 2000 with an optional floor stand, turning the normally horizontal desktop case on its side and allowing it to be stashed under-desk; the square badge on the Tandy 2000 can be removed and rotated upright in turn. IBM followed suit with their PC/AT in 1984, which included an optional "floor-standing enclosure" for $165. Of the three initial entrants in the company's RT PC line in 1986, two were tower units, while the other was a traditional horizontal case like the AT and the PCs before it.

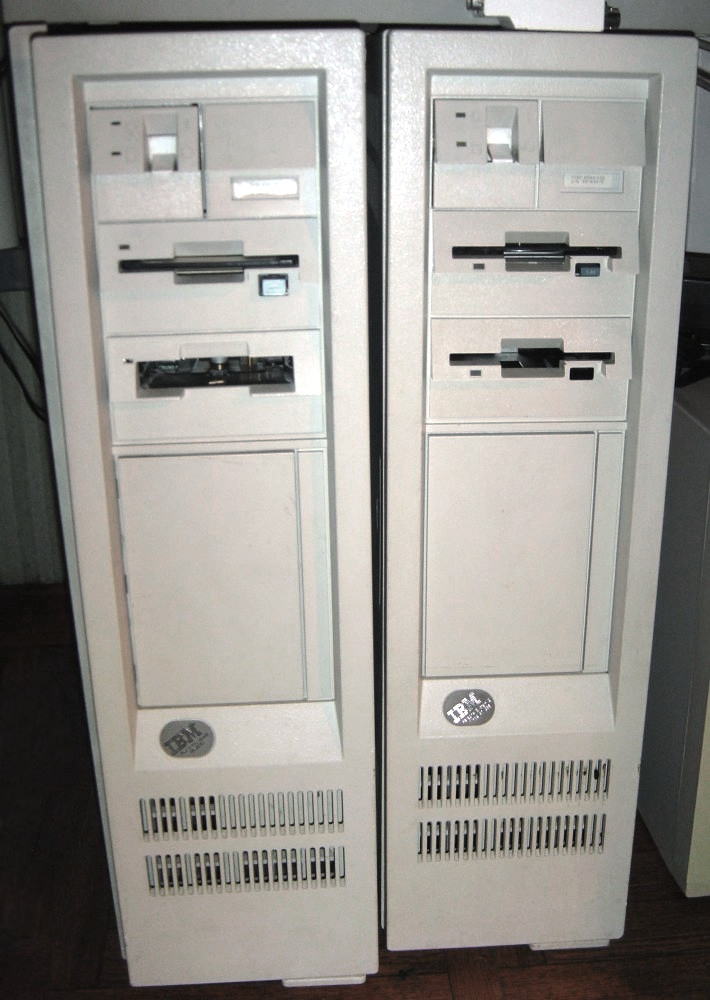
An IBM PS/2 Model 60 (left) and an PS/2 Model 80 (right) side by side. These models were IBM's first Intel-based PCs built in a tower form factor.

In 1987, IBM introduced the PS/2 Model 60, an initial entry in the company's Personal System/2 line of personal computers. It was IBM's first Intel-based PC built entirely into a tower case. The PS/2 Model 60 was comparable in technical specification to its sibling the PS/2 Model 50, which sported a horizontal desktop form factor. Whereas the Model 50 had only four expansion slots and three drive bays, however, the Model 60 featured eight expansion slots and four drive bays. Because of the latter's increased potential for connectivity and multitasking, technology journalists envisioned the PS/2 Model 60 as a multiuser machine, although multiuser operating systems supporting the 80286 processor of both the Models 50 and 60 were hard to come by in 1987. IBM followed up with the tower-based PS/2 Model 80 later that year, their first PC powered by an i386 processor.

According to The New York Times in 1988, the PS/2 Models 60 and 80 started the trend of computer manufacturers offering IBM PC compatibles in optional tower form factors:

A countertrend is to take PCs off the desk and put them on the floor. IBM started it with the tower configuration for its PS/2 Models 60 and 80, and at least a dozen companies were showing floor-standing PCs at Comdex. Freed from the need to fit on a desk, some of the tower models are actually getting bigger to accommodate large disk drives, a variety of floppy drives and backup devices, and room for up to a dozen slots for plug-in boards.

Aftermarket floor stands, allowing existing horizontal desktop computers to be stored upright on the floor, were sold in the late 1980s by companies such as Curtis Computer Products. Recommending such kits in The Washington Post in 1989, Brit Hume called the tower the best configuration for ergonomics and noted that, "Contrary to popular myth, standing vertically will not hurt the computer or throw off your disk drives."

The transition in dominance from horizontal desktop computers to towers was mostly complete by 1994, according to a period article in PC Week. Computer cases or pre-built systems offered in the traditional horizontal form factor have since been separately categorized as desktops, to contrast them with the usually-floor-situated towers.

Brian Benchoff of Hackaday argued that the popularity of the Macintosh Quadra 700 was the turning point for computer manufacturers to move over to the tower form factor en masse. The tower form factor of the Quadra 700 was by necessity: common peripherals of the Quadra were the relatively extremely heavy color CRT monitors offered by Apple (those whose screens measured 20 inches and over diagonally could weigh 80 lbs or more) favored by the desktop publishing industry during the 1990s. Such monitors threatened to crush the plastic frames of the Macintosh IIcx and Macintosh IIci; customers might have been tempted to fit such heavy monitors atop the IIcx and IIci because of their horizontal form factor.

== See also ==
- All-in-one computer
- Beige box
- Desktop form factor
- Thin client
