= Power Macintosh 7100 =

Personal computer by Apple Computer

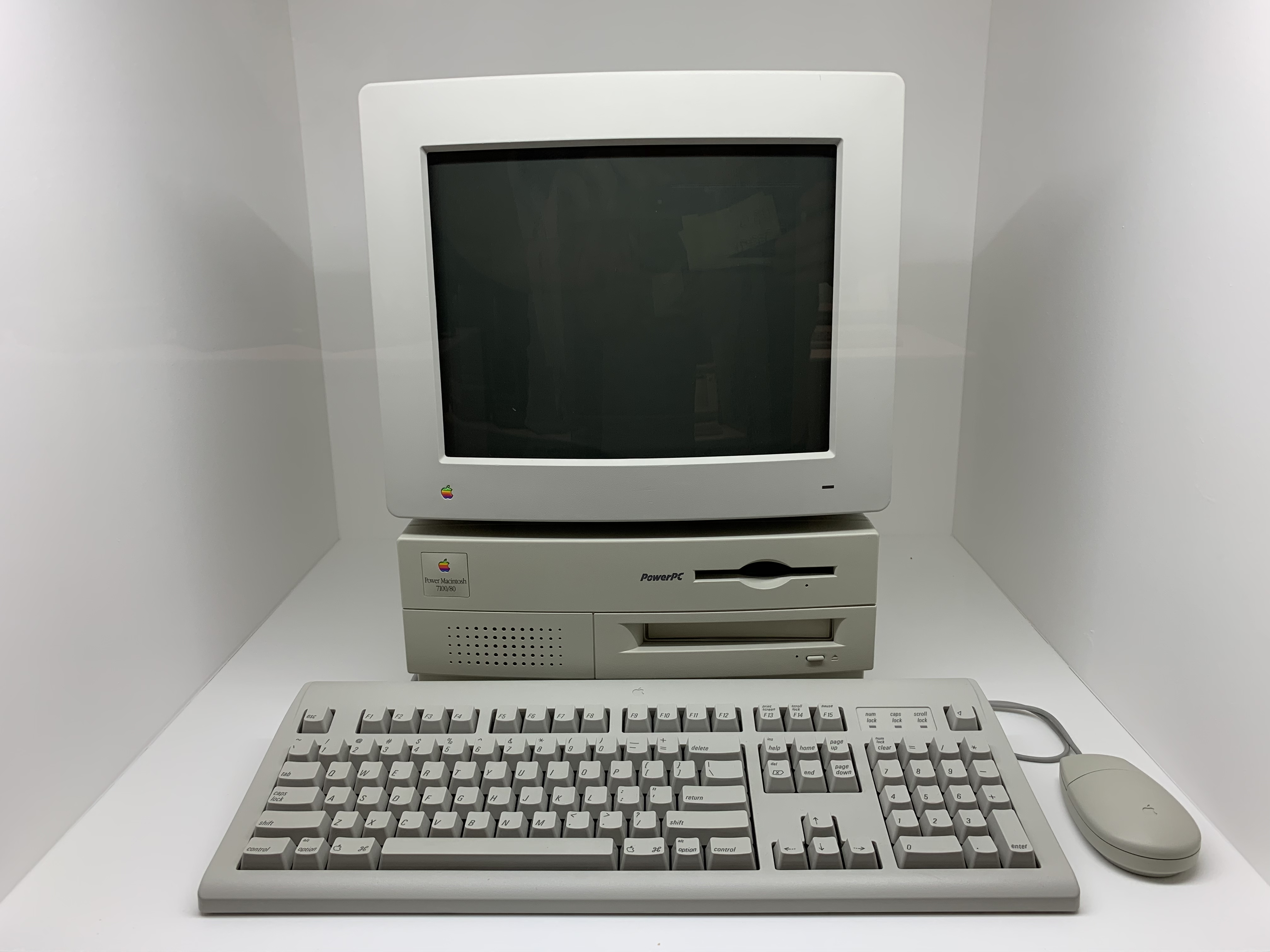
- Power Macintosh 7100/80 on display at Apple Museum, Prague
- Also known as: "Carl Sagan"; "BHA (Butt-Head Astronomer)"; "LAW (Lawyers Are Wimps)"
- Developer: Apple Computer, Inc.
- Product family: Power Macintosh
- Released: March 14, 1994
- Introductory price: US$2,650 (equivalent to $5,800 in 2025)
- Discontinued: January 6, 1996
- Operating system: System 7.1.2 – Mac OS 9.1
- CPU: PowerPC 601 @ 66 or 80 MHz
- Memory: 8 MB, expandable to 136 MB (80 ns 72 pin SIMM)
- Dimensions: 6 × 13 × 16.5 in (150 × 330 × 420 mm)
- Weight: 25 lb (11 kg)
- Predecessor: Macintosh Quadra 650; Macintosh Quadra 840AV
- Successor: Power Macintosh 7200
- Related: Power Macintosh 6100; Power Macintosh 8100; Workgroup Server 9150

The Power Macintosh 7100 is a personal computer introduced by Apple Computer in March 1994 and sold until January 1996. It was the mid-range model in the first generation of the Power Macintosh line, positioned between the entry-level Power Macintosh 6100 and the high-end Power Macintosh 8100. The 7100 reused the Macintosh IIvx case with few changes. The initial model used a 66 MHz PowerPC 601 processor; Apple introduced an 80 MHz version in January 1995. Apple introduced the Power Macintosh 7200 and Power Macintosh 7500 in August 1995, although sales of the 7100 continued into early 1996.

== Models ==
The 7100AV variants included a 2 MB VRAM card with S-Video input and output. The non-AV models had a video card with 1 MB of VRAM, expandable to 2 MB, and lacked S-Video input and output.

Unlike some contemporary Macintosh Quadra models, the 7100 did not have a "DOS Compatible" card. Apple instead offered it bundled with the SoftWindows emulator for US$385 (equivalent to $836 in 2025). With an optional 256 KB L2 cache card installed, MacWorld found its performance comparable to that of a 25 MHz Intel 80486SX.

Introduced March 14, 1994:

- Power Macintosh 7100/66: 66 MHz CPU with no L2 cache. US$2,650 (equivalent to $5,800 in 2025) MSRP.
- Power Macintosh 7100/66AV: US$3,450 (equivalent to $7,500 in 2025) MSRP.

Introduced January 3, 1995:

- Power Macintosh 7100/80: 80 MHz CPU with 256 KB L2 cache.
- Power Macintosh 7100/80AV

== Codename lawsuits ==
The Power Macintosh 7100's internal code name was "Carl Sagan", a reference to Sagan's phrase "billions and billions" and an expectation that the model would generate substantial sales for Apple. The company also used the code names "Piltdown Man" for the Power Macintosh 6100, after the scientific hoax, and "Cold Fusion" for the 8100, after the discredited type of nuclear reaction. Sagan was reportedly not pleased his name was being used alongside two prominent examples of pseudo-science.

After the code names became known to the press in 1993, Sagan sent Apple a cease-and-desist letter. Apple said that it would stop using his name. In January 1994, press reports described a replacement code name, "BHA", an abbreviation for "Butt-Head Astronomer". Sagan sued Apple for libel. In October 1994, the United States District Court dismissed the suit, holding that the term did not imply an assertion of fact about Sagan's competence as an astronomer.

After the dismissal, Sagan later sued Apple over its earlier use of his name. The second case was also dismissed. After Sagan appealed the decision in that case, the parties reached a confidential out-of-court settlement in November 1995. Apple apologized for any embarrassment or concern caused to Sagan and his family. The project's final code name was "LAW", for "Lawyers Are Wimps".

== Timeline ==
Timeline of Power Macintosh models
See also: List of Mac models
