= Power Macintosh 8100 =

Personal computer by Apple Computer

Power Macintosh 8100 / Power Macintosh 8115 / Workgroup Server 8150
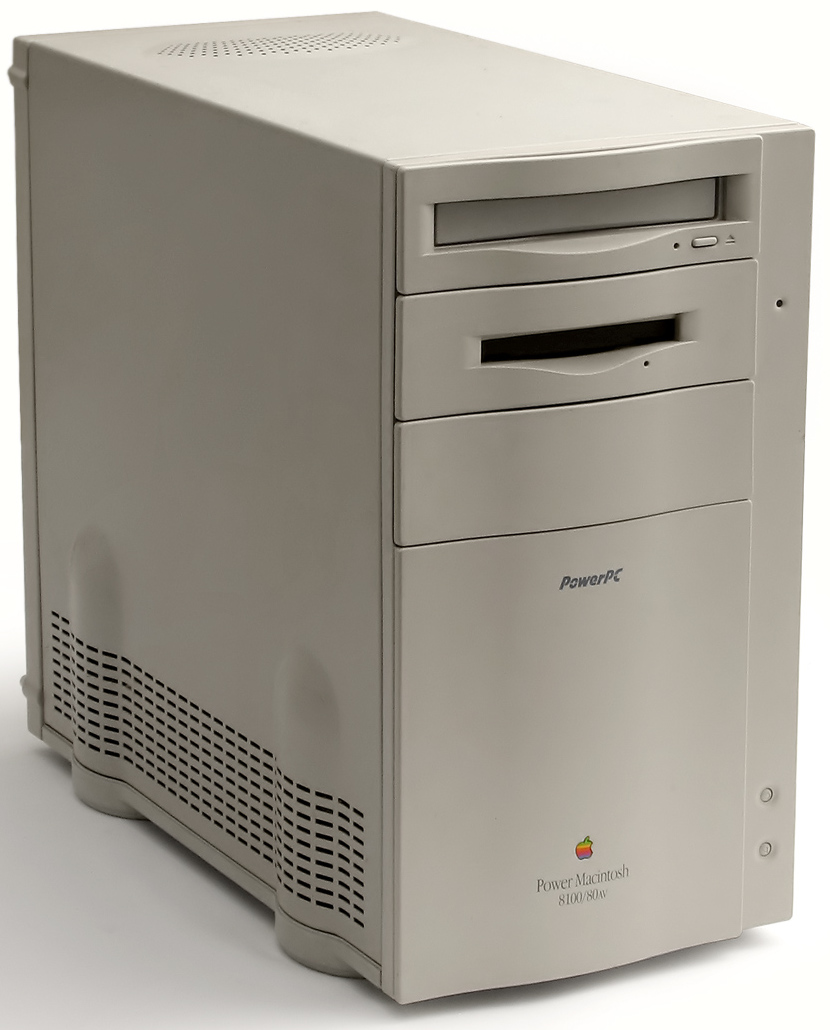
- A Power Macintosh 8100/80AV
- Also known as: "Cold Fusion", "Flagship"
- Developer: Apple Computer
- Product family: Power Macintosh, Workgroup Server
- Released: March 14, 1994
- Introductory price: US$4,200 (equivalent to $9,123 in 2025)
- Discontinued: August 5, 1995
- Operating system: System 7.1.2 – Mac OS 9.1
- CPU: PowerPC 601 @ 80 or 100 MHz; PowerPC 601v @ 110 MHz
- Memory: 8 MB, expandable to 264 MB (80 ns, 72-pin SIMM)
- Predecessor: Macintosh Quadra 650; Macintosh Quadra 800; Macintosh Quadra 840AV
- Successor: Power Macintosh 8500
- Related: Power Macintosh 6100; Power Macintosh 7100; Workgroup Server 9150

The Power Macintosh 8100 (also sold in Japan as the Power Macintosh 8115 and with bundled server software as the Workgroup Server 8150) is a personal computer that is a part of Apple Computer's Power Macintosh series of Macintosh computers. It was introduced in March 1994 alongside the Power Macintosh 6100 and the 7100 as the high end model of the first generation of the Power Macintosh family, and is a direct replacement of the prior Macintosh Quadra 800. It retains the Quadra 800's enclosure.

The 8100 originally featured a PowerPC 601 at 80 MHz, and was speed-bumped to 100 MHz in January 1995. The main variant of the 8100 are the 8100AV models, which came with an analog video in/out card in its Processor Direct Slot. A faster 110 MHz model was released in November 1994 without an AV variant.

The case has received criticism for being difficult to work with. Dan Knight, writing for Low End Mac, noted that "except for replacing the CPU card in the 8500, changing anything on the motherboard required completely removing it. That included removing the reset button, removing a screw, disconnecting several cables, then sliding the motherboard assembly forward about an inch, then pulling it away from its mounts."

In August 1995, the 8100 was discontinued, with the Power Macintosh 8500 taking its place.

== Models ==
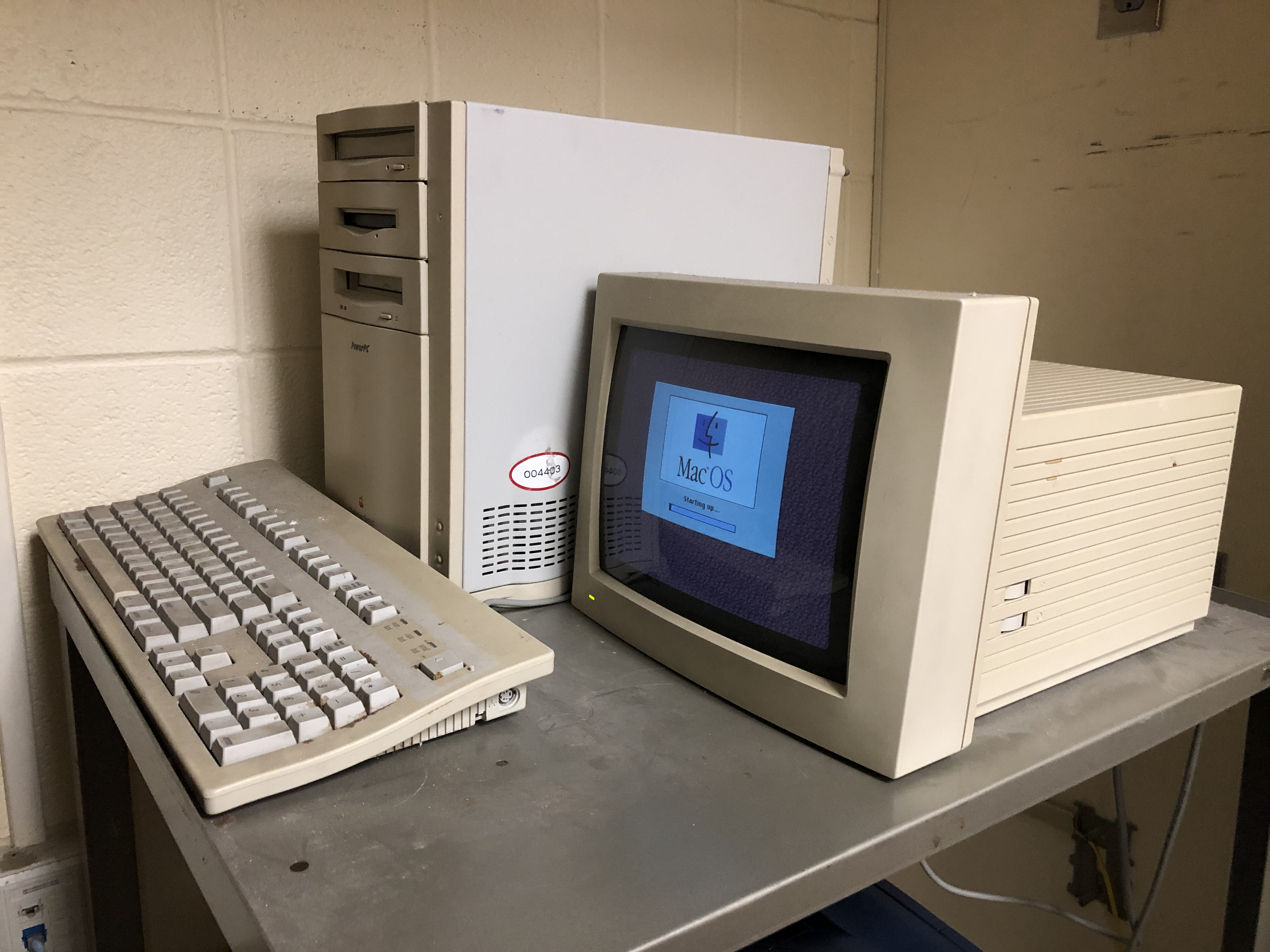
An upgraded Workgroup Server 8150, operating in 2020

Introduced March 14, 1994:

- Power Macintosh 8100/80:
- Power Macintosh 8100/80AV:

Introduced April 25, 1994:

- Workgroup Server 8150:

Introduced November 3, 1994:

- Power Macintosh 8100/110:

Introduced January 3, 1995:

- Power Macintosh 8100/100:
- Power Macintosh 8100/100AV:

Introduced February 23, 1995:

- Power Macintosh 8115/110:

Introduced April 3, 1995:

- Workgroup Server 8150/110:

== In popular culture ==
Sandra Bullock, starring as systems analyst Angela Bennett, uses a Power Macintosh 8100 as her primary workstation in the movie The Net (1995).

== Timeline ==
Timeline of Power Macintosh models
See also: List of Mac models
