= Apple Communication Slot =

Expansion data interface in Apple Macintosh computers

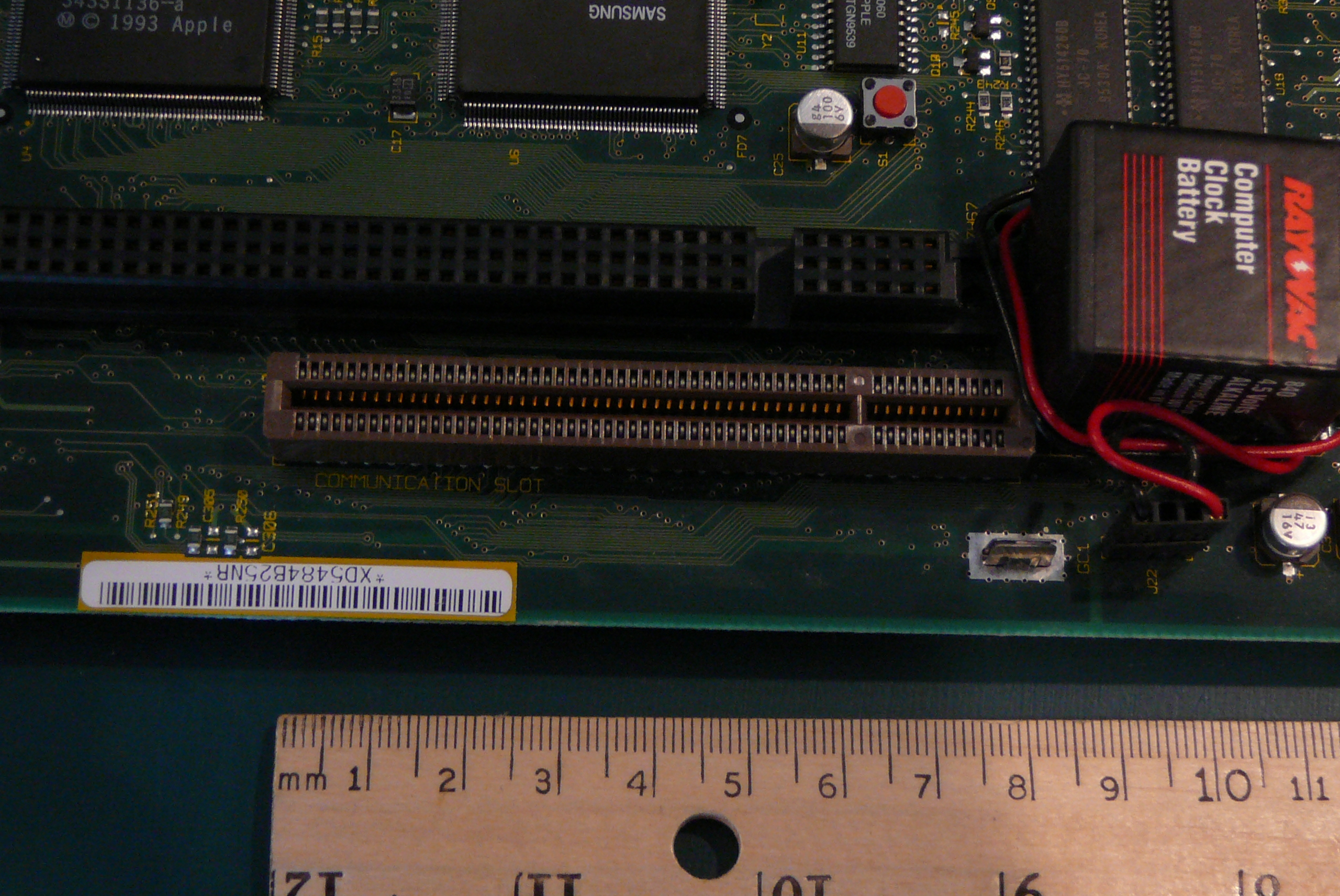
Communication Slot

The Apple Communication Slot, or Comm Slot, is an internal expansion data interface (slot) found in Apple Macintosh computers from the early to mid-1990s. It was designed as an inexpensive way to add communication expansion cards like network adapters or modems to Macs and Power Macs.

The slot exists in two forms. The original Communication Slot standard was introduced in the Macintosh LC 575 and can be identified by the notch toward its rear. This slot is based on the LC PDS. An updated PCI-based Communication Slot II debuted with the Performa 6360. This new slot moved the notch to the front so that incompatible cards could not be inserted.

In addition to the respective expansion bus pins, these slots also carried audio and serial lines. The serial bus was shared with the external modem port. Because the power and serial pins remained unchanged between the two slots, it was possible to design a universal modem card which could work in either. Network adapters, however, needed to be designed for one or the other.

A major disadvantage to both is that when a modem card is installed in the Communication Slot, the modem serial port on the back of the computer is disabled. Computers that came with this card installed had the modem port blanked out (though the connector was still present). Further, due to its unconventional architecture, the Performa 5200's printer port would be disabled if a network adapter was installed in the Communication Slot.

== Compatible computers ==
=== Communication Slot ===
A Communication Slot (some documentation refers to this as a Communication Card I Slot) is found in some 68040 and PowerPC CPU Macs.

- Macintosh LC/Performa 575 family
- Macintosh LC/Performa 580 family
- Macintosh Quadra/Performa/LC 630 family
- Power Macintosh/Performa 5200 family
- Power Macintosh/Performa 5300 family
- Power Macintosh/Performa 6200 family
- Power Macintosh/Performa 6300 family (except 6360)

=== Communication Slot II ===
The Communication Slot II was used in the 6360 and later series of Power Macs and Performas.

- Power Macintosh/Performa 6360
- Power Macintosh/Performa 5400 family
- Power Macintosh/Performa 5500 family
- Power Macintosh/Performa 6400 family
- Power Macintosh/Performa 6500 family
- Power Macintosh 4400 (a.k.a. Power Macintosh 7220)
- Twentieth Anniversary Macintosh
- Umax C600 (Apus 3000 in Europe) Macintosh Clone

In addition, a modified Communication Slot II was present on the Power Macintosh G3 personality cards. This slot only provided power and serial lines, leaving the PCI pins disconnected. For this reason it could only be used with modem cards. As in other machines, the external modem port is disabled when a modem is installed in the Communication Slot.

== Cards ==
=== Communication Slot ===
- 14.4 modem Macintosh Express Fax/Modem (Part M2480LL/A)
- 10BASE-T Apple Ethernet CS Twisted Pair Card (Part M3065Z/A)
- 10BASE2 Apple Ethernet CS Thin Coax (coax cable) Card (Part M2708Z/A)
- AUI Apple Ethernet CS AAUI Card (Part M3066Z/A)

=== Communication Slot II ===
- 28.8 kbit/s Global Village or Apple GeoPort modem
- 10BASE-T Apple EtherNet CS II Twisted-Pair Card (Part M4772ZM/A; Order 661-1171)
- 10BASE2 (thin coax) Ethernet Card (Part M4773ZM/A)
- AAUI (Apple standard) Ethernet Card (Part M4774ZM/A)

Additional cards were offered by third parties.
