= Quik (boot loader) =

quik is a boot loader originally written by Paul Mackerras, designed to run Linux on PCI-based Apple Macintosh PowerPC systems based on the Old World ROM architecture. Quik's loader boots from Open Firmware and bypasses Mac OS entirely. PowerPC Macintoshes based on the New World ROM architecture instead use yaboot.

quik does not work on systems that do not have Open Firmware, including older PowerPC hardware based on the NuBus architecture; these systems must boot into Mac OS first and then use a separate boot loader. BootX (Linux) for instance uses this approach (using code derived from quik), which is dependent on Mac OS. All other Linux boot loaders for PowerPC (including the aforementioned yaboot) also reused portions of the code from quik. quik is the only method of booting Linux on an Apple Network Server.

== iQUIK ==
iQUIK is a maintained version of quik. Whereas the original quik follows a LILO-like booting model (with the second stage embedded inside an OS partition), iQUIK normally boots using its second stage in the first non-partitionmap partition (i.e. the second partition of the APM-partitioned storage device). This makes for a more robust system, making it more difficult to end up with a completely unbootable system. It also means that it is possible to create rescue floppies and install media with iQUIK.

Other improvements include:

- Initrd support
- Install to floppy
- Preboot scripts (CHRP script-like support)
- Booting Linux kernels of any size, from 2.2 up (including 3.0 and probably newer)
- Richer UI with more commands to locate and boot kernels
- Better ext2 file system support with symlinks, listing directories
- Better hardware and firmware support, working around OpenFirmware 1.0.5 and 2.0.1 bugs
- Cross-compile support with a recent tool chain and no external library dependencies

== See also ==
- Comparison of bootloaders
- BootX (Linux), a replacement boot loader for loading Linux on Old World Macs
- yaboot, a replacement boot loader for loading Linux on New World Macs
