= Twentieth Anniversary Macintosh =

Limited-edition Apple computer

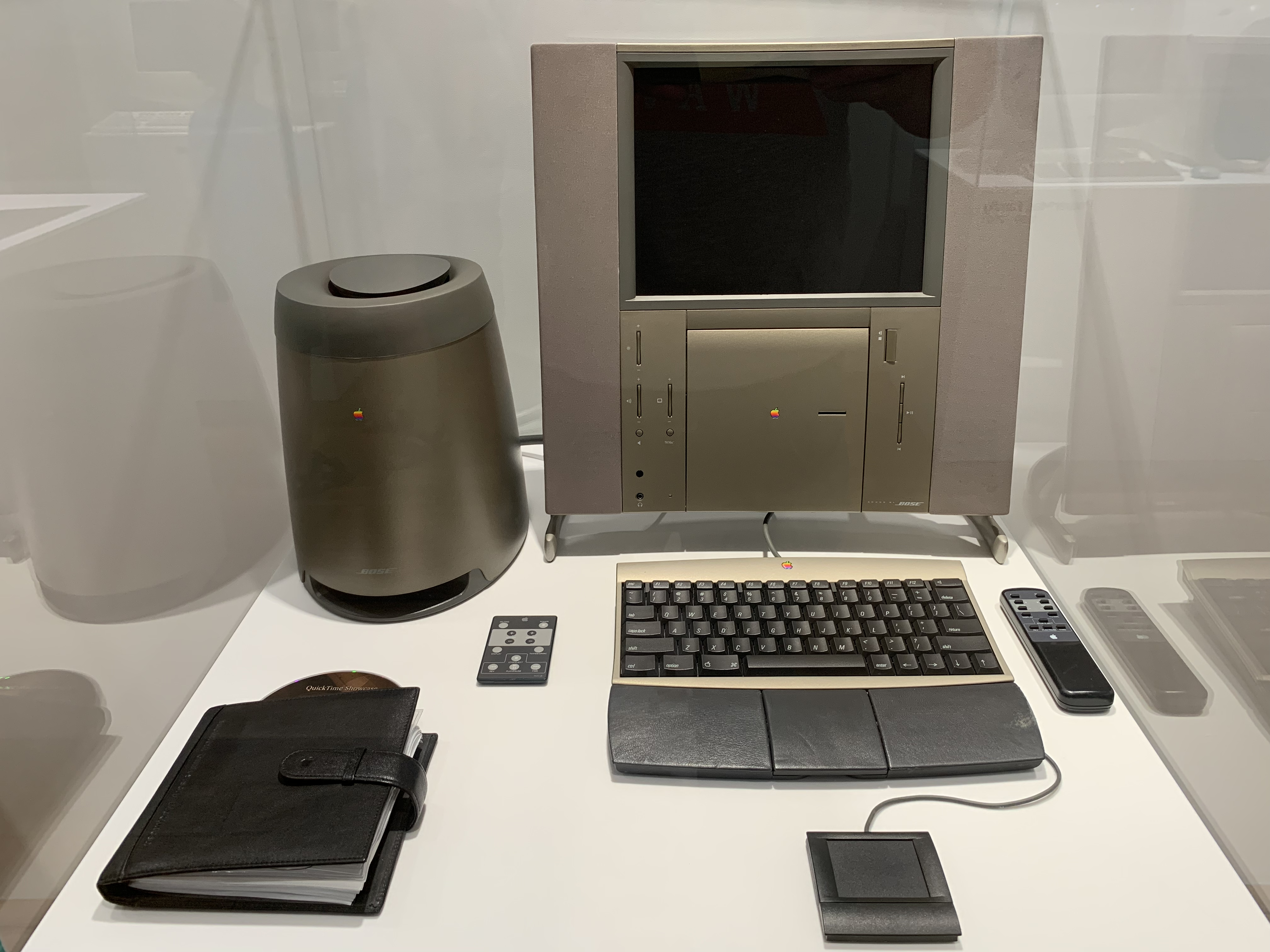
- Twentieth Anniversary Macintosh on display at the Apple Museum, Prague
- Codename: Pomona; Smoke & Mirrors; Spartacus
- Developer: Apple Computer
- Type: All-in-one
- Released: March 20, 1997
- Lifespan: 11 months
- Introductory price: US$7,499 (equivalent to $15,040 in 2025)
- Discontinued: March 14, 1998
- Units shipped: 11,601
- Media: Floppy Drive (SuperDrive); CD-ROM (4× speed)
- Operating system: Mac OS 7.6.1 – Mac OS 9.1
- CPU: PowerPC 603ev @ 250 MHz
- Memory: RAM: 32 MB (2 slots, expandable to 128 MB); VRAM: 2 MB
- Storage: 2 GB IDE
- Display: 12.1" active-matrix LCD, 800 × 600, 16-bits
- Graphics: ATI 3D RAGE II
- Input: Rear: Audio input, audio output, SCSI, TV tuner, FM tuner; Rear (under cover): 2× GeoPort, ADB, S-Video, audio line in; Expansion slots: ACS II, 2× PCI
- Dimensions: 17.5 × 16.5 × 10 in (440 × 420 × 250 mm)
- Weight: 14.9 lb (6.8 kg)

The Twentieth Anniversary Macintosh (TAM) is a limited-edition personal computer introduced by Apple Computer in 1997 to commemorate the company's 20th anniversary. It featured an integrated LCD display, Bose sound system, and other premium features, and was marketed to the executive market.

== History ==
Apple developed the Twentieth Anniversary Macintosh to commemorate the company's 20th anniversary on April 1, 1996. Developed under the codename "Spartacus" (also known internally as "Pomona" and "Smoke & Mirrors"), the project was intended to produce a limited-edition Macintosh showcasing new industrial design concepts. Because the computer had to be completed on a shorter schedule than a typical Macintosh, the design team incorporated existing hardware components where possible while developing a new LCD-based enclosure.

Apple announced the Twentieth Anniversary Macintosh at the Macworld Expo in San Francisco in January 1997, with availability beginning on March 20. According to Leander Kahney, the computer was initially conceived as a mainstream Macintosh before being repositioned as a limited-edition premium model.

Apple bundled the Twentieth Anniversary Macintosh with a concierge service package that included in-home delivery and setup, where an Apple technician installed the computer, configured the hardware and software, and offered training to the user. The package also extended the typical one-year warranty to three years.

Early reports suggested a retail price of US$9,000 (equivalent to $18,050 in 2025). Apple ultimately introduced the computer at US$7,499 (equivalent to $15,040 in 2025). During its production run, the price was reduced to approximately US$3,500 (equivalent to $7,020 in 2025). When the Twentieth Anniversary Macintosh was discontinued in March 1998, Apple reduced the remaining inventory to US$1,995 (equivalent to $3,941 in 2025), and U.S. dealers sold out within two weeks. Apple later offered customers who had purchased the computer at its original price a PowerBook as compensation.

== Specifications and design ==
The Twentieth Anniversary Macintosh used a 250 MHz PowerPC 603ev processor with an integrated floating-point unit, 32 KB of L1 cache, and 256 KB of L2 cache. It shipped with 32 MB of RAM installed in two 168-pin DIMM slots and supported up to 128 MB of memory.

The computer featured a 12.1-inch (310 mm) active-matrix LCD with an 800 × 600 native resolution. Graphics were provided by an ATI 3D Rage II processor with 2 MB of dedicated SGRAM capable of displaying thousands of colors at 640 × 480 and 800 × 600 resolutions.

Storage consisted of a 2 GB 2.5-inch ATA hard disk drive, a vertically mounted 4× CD-ROM drive, and a 1.44 MB Apple SuperDrive floppy disk drive. Multimedia hardware included an integrated TV/FM tuner card with S-Video input and composite video support, and a custom Bose sound system with stereo speakers integrated into the display housing and a separate subwoofer housed in the external power supply.

The Twentieth Anniversary Macintosh shipped with a compact 75-key ADB keyboard featuring leather palm rests and a detachable trackpad. The keyboard could slide beneath the display when not in use. A remote control was included for operating the TV/FM tuner and 4× speed CD player, while front-panel controls provided access to audio volume, display brightness and contrast, CD playback, and television functions. The computer shipped with a customized version of Mac OS 7.6.1, which provided software control for these integrated multimedia features.

Standard connectivity included two GeoPort serial ports, an ADB port, a DB-25 SCSI port, microphone and headphone jacks, and audio input and output ports. Expansion was provided through a 7-inch PCI slot and an Apple Communication Slot II for optional networking or modem cards. Installing expansion cards required replacing the standard rear cover with a larger cover included with the computer.

Standard connectivity included two GeoPort serial ports, an ADB port, DB-25 SCSI, microphone, headphone, and audio ports. Expansion was provided through a 7-inch PCI slot and an Apple Communication Slot II (which allowed adding Ethernet), although to use these cards required replacing the standard rear cover with a larger enclosure, included with the computer.

The computer measured 17.25 by 16.5 by 10 inches (438 by 419 by 254 mm) and weighed 14.9 pounds (6.8 kg). The external power supply and subwoofer measured 10.63 by 8.31 by 11.75 inches (270 by 211 by 298 mm) and weighed 10.5 pounds (4.8 kg).

Third-party upgrades later became available that used the L2 cache slot to install faster G3 processors, although these required use of the larger rear enclosure.

== Production and release ==
The TAM was released in the US, Japan, France, Germany, and the UK. Apple produced 12,000 units, of which 11,601 were sold and 399 were kept by Apple for use as spare parts.

Due to the scarcity of scale, rather than training all Apple authorized technicians in repairing the TAM, Apple opted to ship faulty units to three central locations worldwide: one per continent. The US location was the Eastman Kodak Company's service center in Rochester, New York. Apple's Service Source manual, containing information for authorized technicians in the repair of Apple computers, lists the TAM as a "closed unit", to be returned to said repair locations for all repairs. It does not contain a "take apart" guide for the TAM.

== Reception and legacy ==
The Twentieth Anniversary Macintosh was criticized for being too expensive compared to other computers. PC World placed the TAM as 25th in their "Worst Tech Products of All Time" feature in 2006, citing it as one of the priciest listed personal computer despite offering comparatively modest hardware.

Both of Apple's founders, Steve Wozniak and Steve Jobs, were on stage at Macworld when the Twentieth Anniversary Macintosh was announced, and both received a TAM. When Wozniak allowed people to see into his office via webcam in the late 1990s, his TAM was visible on his desk. Jobs reportedly "hated" the TAM.

Jony Ive was a member of the design team for the Twentieth Anniversary Macintosh before becoming head of Apple's Industrial Design Group. Several design concepts introduced in the TAM, including the LCD-based all-in-one form factor, later appeared in products such as the iMac G4 and iMac G5.

== In popular culture ==
The Twentieth Anniversary Macintosh has been featured in numerous films and television series, including:

- Seinfeld: Several episodes of the ninth and final season in Jerry's apartment.
- Friends: Behind Chandler's office desk in the fourth season, in the episode "The One With the Worst Best Man Ever".
- The Real World: Seattle: Present on the desk in the Pier 70 office.
- Sabrina (1995): A prototype TAM is on the desk of Linus Larrabee.
- Batman & Robin (1997): A prototype TAM is used by Alfred to write a CD (a capability the real computer did not have).
- Children of Men (2006): A TAM is used in Jasper's hideout to show video feeds of intruders breaking in.

Timeline of Power Macintosh models
See also: List of Mac models
