= Power Macintosh G3 =

Series of personal computers by Apple

Power Macintosh G3 / Macintosh Server G3

- Power Macintosh G3 Mini Tower (left) and Power Mac G3 Blue and White (right)
- Manufacturer: Apple Computer
- Product family: Power Macintosh
- Type: Desktop computer
- Released: November 10, 1997
- Lifespan: 1 year, 9 months
- Introductory price: US$1,599 (equivalent to $3,207 in 2025)
- Discontinued: August 31, 1999
- CPU: PowerPC G3 @ 233–450 MHz
- Predecessor: All-in-one: Power Macintosh 5400; Power Macintosh 5500; Twentieth Anniversary Macintosh; Desktop: Power Macintosh 4400; Power Macintosh 6200; Power Macintosh 7300; Mini Tower: Power Macintosh 6500; Power Macintosh 8600; Power Macintosh 9600
- Successor: All-in-one: iMac G3; Desktop: Power Mac G4 Cube; Mini Tower: Power Mac G4
- Made in: USA, Ireland

The Power Macintosh G3 (also sold with additional software as the Macintosh Server G3) is a series of Power Macintosh personal computers designed, manufactured, and sold by Apple Computer. Introduced on November 10, 1997, the series marked the debut of the PowerPC G3 processor and replaced eight earlier Power Macintosh models and the Twentieth Anniversary Macintosh with three configurations: a Desktop model, a Mini Tower, and an all-in-one model sold exclusively to the education market. Its introduction also coincided with Apple's launch of build-to-order Macintosh sales through its online store.

The Power Macintosh G3 was introduced during a period of major restructuring at Apple following the return of co-founder Steve Jobs. As part of the company's effort to simplify its product lineup, the G3 became Apple's professional desktop offering under Jobs' four-quadrant product strategy. The Desktop and Mini Tower models reused enclosures from earlier Power Macintosh systems, while introducing the third-generation PowerPC processor, which offered significantly improved performance over previous Power Macintosh models and competing Intel PCs.

Two generations of the Power Macintosh G3 were produced. The first, unofficially known as the "Beige" G3, was introduced in November 1997. The second, officially marketed as the "Blue and White" Power Macintosh G3, was introduced in January 1999 and was succeeded by the Power Mac G4 in August 1999.

== Models ==
=== Beige ===
Apple sold three beige Power Macintosh G3 models: a horizontally-oriented desktop, a mini tower enclosure, and a version with a built-in screen called All-In-One ("AIO").

The computers used a 233, 266, 300, or 333 MHz PowerPC 750 (G3) CPU, these machines use a 66.83 MHz system bus and PC66 SDRAM, and standard ATA hard disk drives instead of the SCSI drives used in most previous Apple systems. The computers retained an internal Fast SCSI bus with a maximum transfer rate of 10 MB/s and an external SCSI bus with a DB-25 connector and a maximum transfer rate of 5 MB/s. Both SCSI buses supported up to seven devices.

Apple developed a prototype G3-based full tower with six PCI slots, codenamed PowerExpress and the Power Macintosh 9700. Despite demand among high-end users for a G3-based system with additional expansion slots, Apple did not develop the prototype into a commercial product. The Power Macintosh 9600 remained Apple's last six-slot Macintosh until the introduction of the 2019 Mac Pro, which had eight PCIe expansion slots.

Initial units were shipped with Mac OS 8. The G3 officially supports up to Mac OS X 10.2, although some devices will not work under Mac OS X, such as the floppy drive, the video features of the "Wings" personality card, and the 3D graphics acceleration functions of the onboard ATI Rage series video.

==== Desktop ====
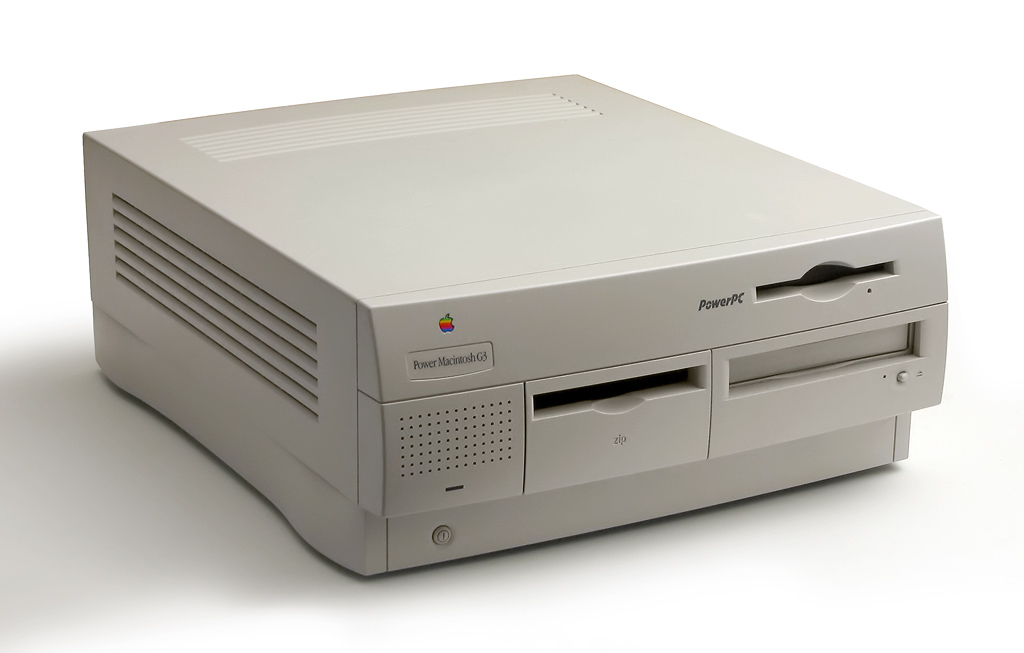
Power Macintosh G3 Desktop

The Desktop model reused the Outrigger enclosure first introduced with the Power Macintosh 7200 and Power Macintosh 7500 in August 1995 with 233 and 266 MHz configurations, including 4 GB hard drives. In August 1998, Apple discontinued the 233 MHz configuration and introduced a 300 MHz configuration with a 6 GB hard drive. Unlike the Mini Tower, the Desktop model was not updated with 333 or 366 MHz processors.

==== Mini-tower ====
The mini-tower model reused the enclosure first introduced with the Power Macintosh 8600 in February 1997. The 233 MHz model shipped with a 4 GB hard drive, the 266 MHz model with a 6 GB drive, and the 300 MHz model with two 4 GB drives configured in a RAID array. All three models used 5,400 RPM drives.

In August 1998, Apple updated the mini-tower models, as it had the desktop models, with 333 and 366 MHz configurations.

These models included a 9.1 GB, 7,200 RPM SCSI hard drive connected through a SCSI/PCI card and a PCI card providing 100BASE-TX Ethernet, replacing the 10BASE-T Ethernet built into earlier models. The Ethernet card occupied an additional PCI slot.

The 333 MHz model and a canceled 366 MHz model had 6 MB of VRAM, while the 300 MHz model included a 128-bit iXMicro PCI video card with 8 MB of VRAM.

==== Server ====
The Macintosh Server G3 is identical to the mini-tower model, but was sold with additional server software and different specifications. Software included AppleShare IP 5.0, Apple Network Administrator Toolkit, and SoftRAID. The Macintosh Server G3/300 also included a PCI Ultra Wide SCSI card and a 100BASE-T Ethernet card.

Introduced March 1998:

- Good: 233 MHz, 512 KiB L2 cache, 64 MiB SDRAM, 6 GB IDE HDD. $2,919.
- Better: 266 MHz, 512 KiB L2 cache, 64 MiB SDRAM, 4 GB Ultra/Wide SCSI. $3,609.
- Best: 300 MHz, 1 MiB L2 cache, 128 MiB SDRAM, Two 4 GB Ultra/Wide SCSI. $4,969.

Introduced September 1998:

- 333 MHz, 1 MiB L2 cache, 128 MiB SDRAM, Two 4 GB Ultra/Wide SCSI. $4,599.

==== All-in-one ====
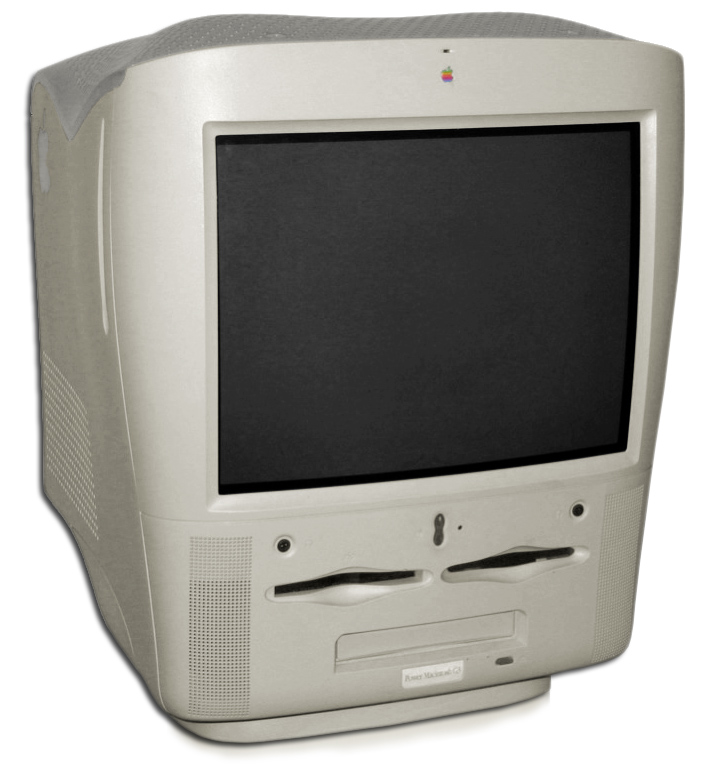
Power Macintosh G3 All-In-One

The All-In-One model was introduced in April 1998 with an all new form factor as a replacement for the Power Macintosh 5400 and 5500, and sold exclusively to the education market. The All-In-One model has a "molar"-like form factor, with its top and rear sections covered in a translucent plastic with machined holes (a design language reminiscent of the then-upcoming iMac). The model has several design features oriented towards the education market, including a slide-out tray for accessing the logic board, recessed rear I/O to make it easier to push the computer up against walls, and dual front headphone jacks for audio sharing.

The G3 AIO was available in two basic configurations, a 233 MHz version with a floppy drive and a 4 GB hard drive, and a 266 MHz version with a built-in Zip drive, floppy drive, and either a "Whisper" personality card or an All-In-One version of the "Wings" personality card. It was the last Macintosh to ship with an internal floppy disk drive. The machine is also noted for its considerable 60 lb (27 kg) weight. It shipped with Mac OS 8.1.

When the iMac G3 was introduced, the G3 AIO and iMac were sold together to the education market until the G3 AIO was discontinued.

=== Blue and White ===
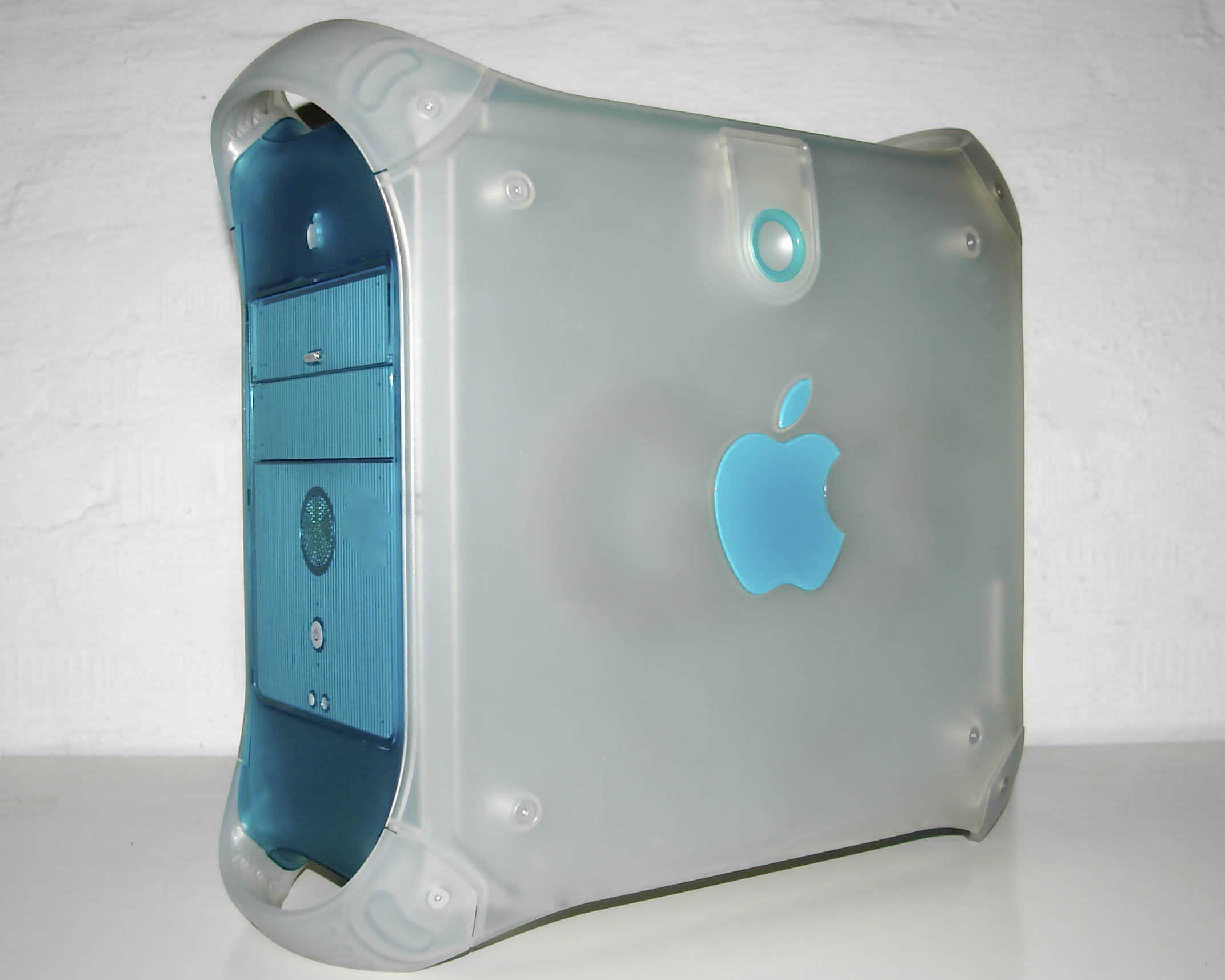
Side view of Power Macintosh G3 (Blue and White)

The Power Mac G3 (Blue and White) (codenamed Yosemite) was introduced in January 1999, replacing the Beige Mini Tower model, with which it shared the name and processor architecture but little else. It is the first Power Macintosh model to include the New World ROM, and the last with ADB port. 300 MHz, 350 MHz and 400 MHz models were introduced with a price range of US$1,599 – US$2,999.

Though still based on the PowerPC G3 architecture, the Blue and White was a completely new design. It was the first new Power Mac model after the release of the iMac G3, and shared the iMac's blue-and-white color scheme. Inside the enclosure, the logic board is mounted on a folding "door", which swings down onto the desk for tool-free access to the computer's internal components.

The same keyboard and mouse designs as those first introduced with the iMac were sold with the system. These featured the same slightly different shade of blue from that of the Bondi Blue iMac to match the new G3 enclosure. The keyboard was criticized in MacWorld's review of the G3 as feeling "cheap compared with the huge Apple keyboard of old" and the removal of several keys. The Apple USB Mouse, previously included with the iMac, was also reviewed poorly, noting that "many users will find it unacceptable: because of the round design, it's impossible to tell the top of the mouse from the bottom by touch."

The Blue and White line was revised in June 1999; the 300 MHz model was dropped and a new 450 MHz model was introduced at a US$2,999 price point.

Early Blue and White units shipped with Mac OS 8.5.1, while later revisions shipped with 8.6. The latest version of Mac OS that can be run on this model is Mac OS X 10.4 Tiger.

== Hardware ==
=== Beige ===
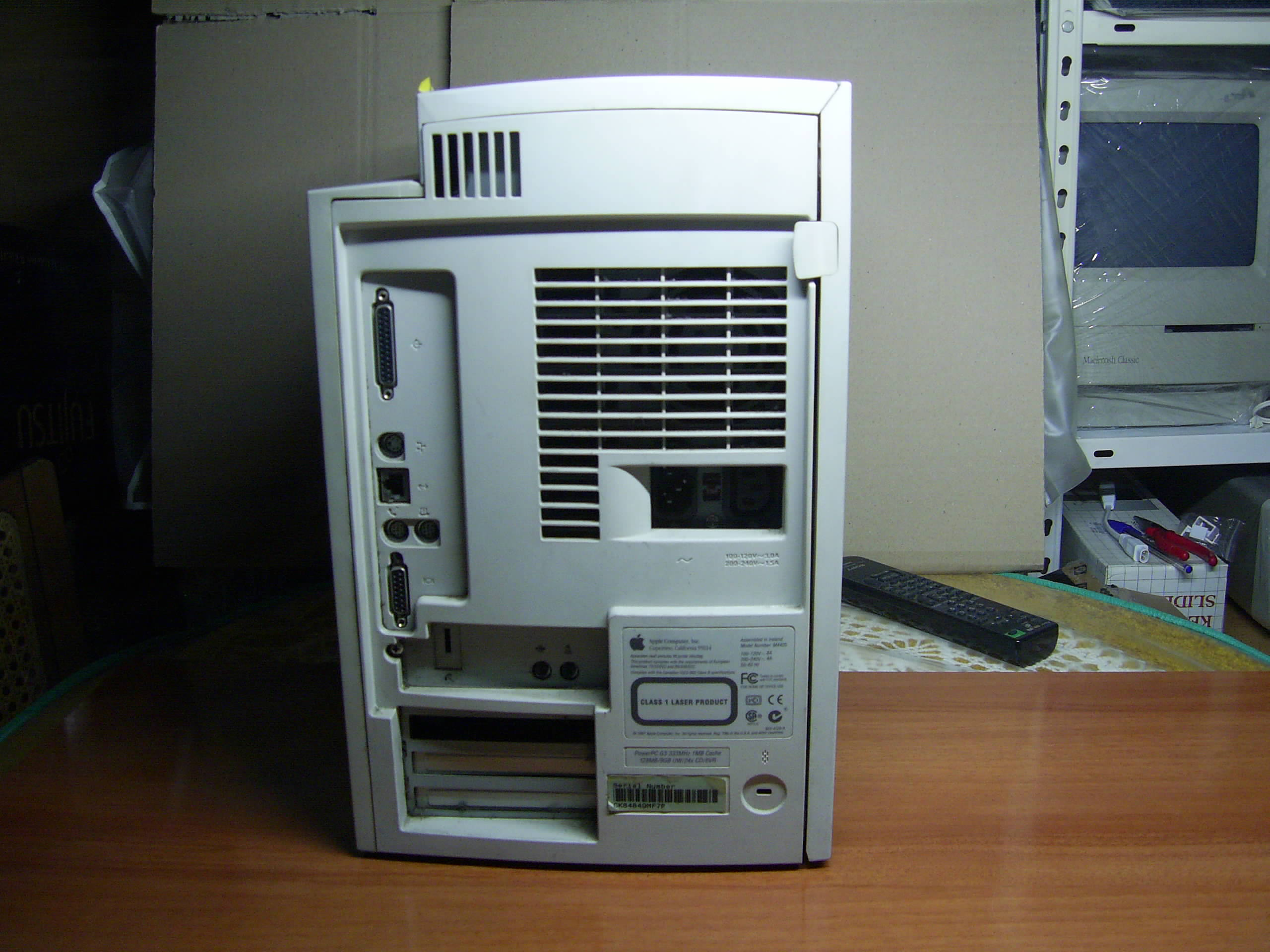
Back of a tower G3. This unit is fitted with the Whisper personality card that lacks analog video capture facilities.

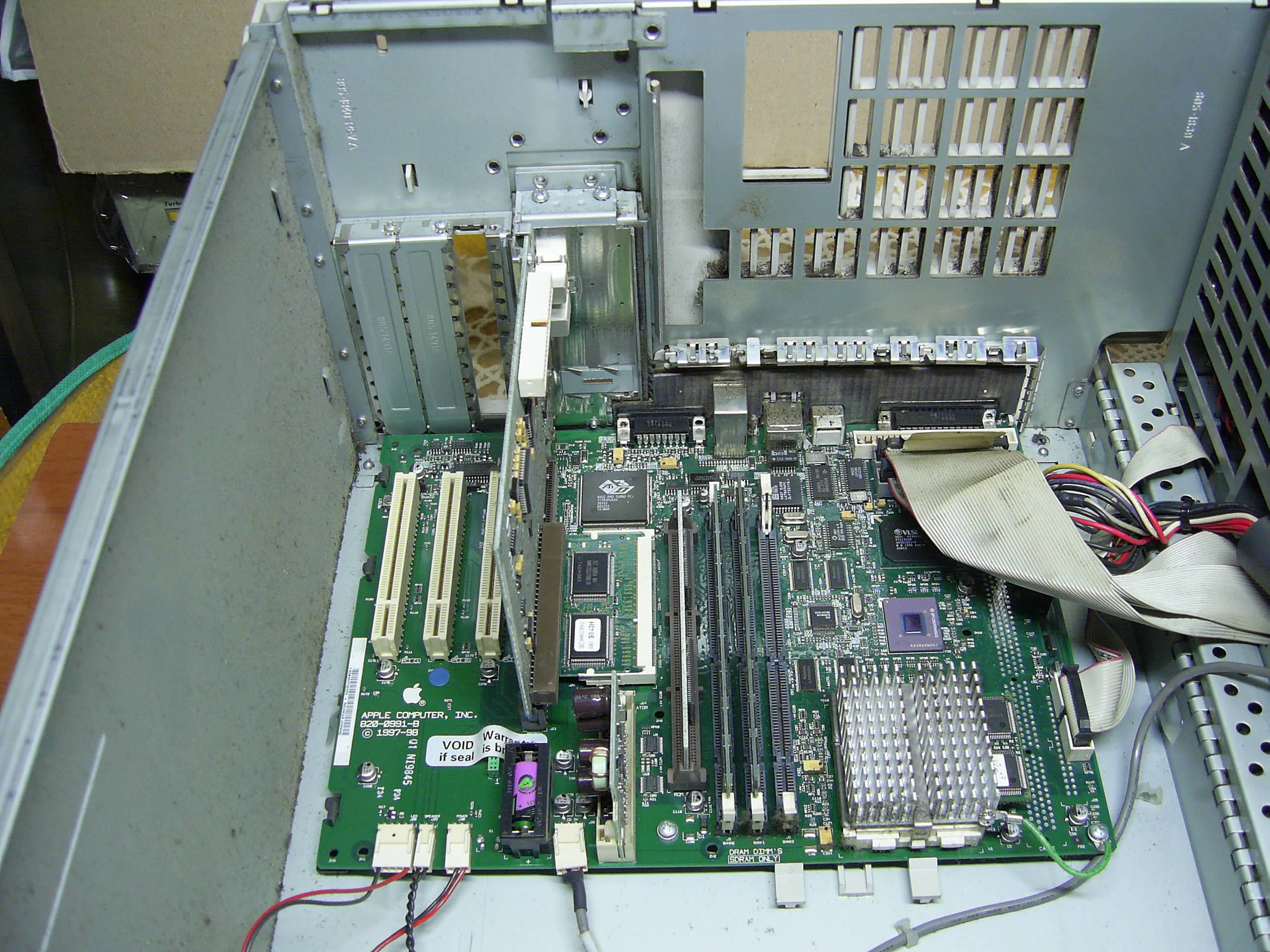
Details of a tower G3 motherboard

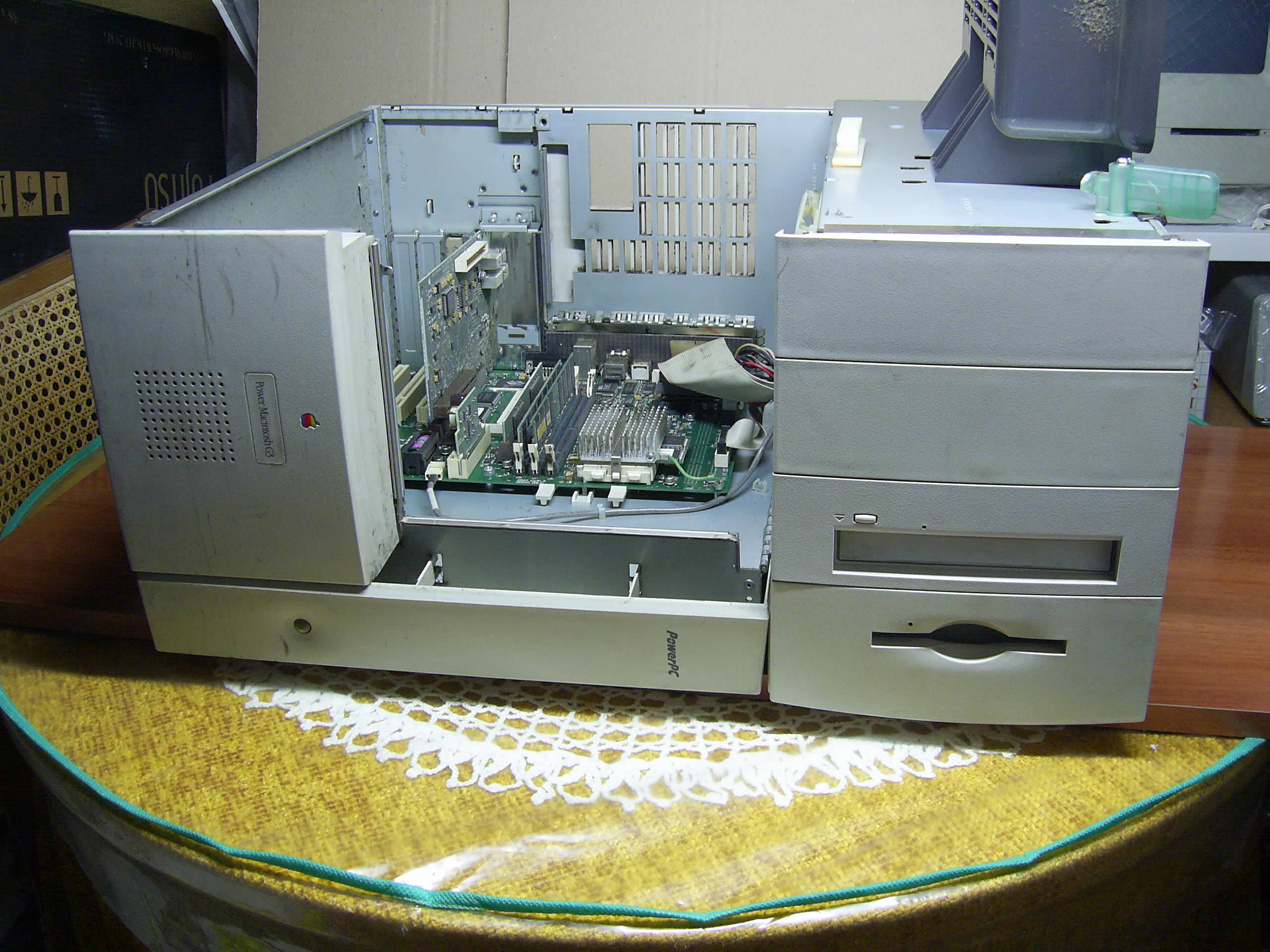
A partially opened G3 minitower

==== Logic board ====
The Beige G3 uses Apple's new "Gossamer" logic board. As a compact and versatile motherboard, the Gossamer board was originally designed to be able to support both the high-end PowerPC 604e and the new PowerPC G3, but when initial testing found that the cheaper G3 outperformed the 604e in many benchmarks, this functionality was removed and Apple's 604e-based systems were discontinued.

Gossamer supports both onboard and external SCSI (from the custom MESH IC), ADB, 10BASE-T Ethernet, two MiniDIN-8 serial ports, and onboard ATI graphics (originally II+, later updated to Pro and then Rage Pro Turbo) with a slot for VRAM upgrades. An external serial port is included; this is the last Power Macintosh model to include one. Three 32-bit PCI slots and one internal modem slot are present, as well as three SDRAM slots.

==== ROM ====
Early G3s with Revision A ROMs do not support slave devices on their IDE controllers, limiting them to one device per bus (normally one optical drive and one hard disk). Additionally, they came with onboard ATI Rage II+ video. G3s with Revision B ROMs support slave devices on their IDE controllers, and had the onboard video upgraded to ATI Rage Pro. G3s with Revision C ROMs also support slave devices on their IDE controllers, but the most significant technical differences are the newer Open Firmware version than the previous two models (2.4 vs 2.0f1) and another onboard video upgrade, this time to ATI Rage Pro Turbo.

The Beige G3 was the last Power Macintosh with a 4 MiB ROM. The trend of increasingly large ROMs ended after the introduction of the New World ROM in the Blue and White G3.

==== Personality cards ====
These machines had no audio circuitry on the logic board; instead, a PERCH slot (a dedicated 182-pin microchannel connector; a superset of the PCI spec, but which does not accept PCI cards) was populated with a "personality card" which provided the audio circuitry. Several "personality cards" were available:

- Whisper was the personality card of the regular versions, providing the Screamer sound ASIC (with 16-bit, 44.1 kHz audio capabilities with simultaneous I/O) and no video facilities.
- Wings or Audio/Video Input/Output Card was an A/V "personality card" which, in addition to the audio I/O, included composite and S-Video capture and output.
- Bordeaux or DVD-Video and Audio/Video Card differed from the Wings card in that it did not include a DAV slot, used the Burgundy sound ASIC (which provided improved sound performance), incorporated a higher performance video capture IC, and included additional circuitry (C-Cube MPEG decoder chip) to support the playback of DVD movies. The All-In-One does not support the Bordeaux card, as it lacks the connectors for the AIO's front panel and RGB video cables.

==== Upgradability ====
CPU: The processor module (a PowerPC 750 plus L2 cache) was overclockable, i.e. 333 MHz and even 366 MHz or 375 MHz with an 83.3 MHz bus (uncommon). Upgrade kits were available from a number of companies, including Newer Technology, PowerLogix and XLR8, offering 400 MHz G3 processors in the US$1,500 – US$1,800 price range. CPU upgrades as high as a 1.0 GHz G4 or 1.1 GHz G3 would eventually become available, although the user would not see much practical difference in performance on chips faster than 733 MHz due to the system bus limitations, which runs at 66.83 MHz unless overclocked. However, G4 chips running over 533 MHz do not allow the system bus to run faster than 66 MHz, so the bus cannot be overclocked if using one of these G4s. (G3s do allow it.)

PCI cards: Gossamer has three full-length (12") PCI slots, making it capable of taking any PCI cards that have Macintosh drivers available for them (for example, some RealTek-based network adapters, a lot of USB, ATA/IDE [or SATA] and FireWire cards). Common PCI card upgrades include FireWire cards, USB cards and FireWire/USB combo cards (especially after the release of the first generation iMac, which caused many vendors to start releasing USB peripherals for the Macintosh), 100BASE-TX or 1000BASE-T (gigabit Ethernet) network adapter, video cards (e.g. ATI Radeon 7000 and 9200), ATA/EIDE, Serial ATA and Ultra SCSI cards. Television tuner and radio cards are also often chosen to supplement the AV features on a Wings personality card, or to provide A/V input for models with the Whisper personality card. The All-In-One can be modified to use a PCI video card with the internal monitor.

Personality cards: Some users have upgraded the Whisper personality card with a "Wings" Personality card (which is plugged into the same PERCH slot), and some have upgraded the ROM to a newer version (Revision A boards to Revision B or Revision C boards).

Hard drives: For storage, the G3 is capable of taking any ATAPI/IDE hard disks, provided that the drive's size is within the 28-bit LBA limit. This means ATA hard disks of up to 137 GB (2^{28} blocks of 512 bytes each) are supported. This limitation can be overcome by using an IDE or SATA PCI-compatible card (e.g. Acard or Sonnet) to enable the use of 2 drives over the 137 GB limit.

Removable storage: The ATAPI/IDE CD-ROM drive can also be replaced with a CD-RW, DVD-ROM or DVD-RW drive, although care must be taken while purchasing the upgrade as the Mac is incompatible with some drives and may refuse to boot at all if an incompatible drive is installed. Also, many third-party optical drives cannot be used as boot devices with the G3, though they work correctly for normal use, and burning on many third party CD-RW and DVD-RW drives requires either commercial drivers or is unsupported even though reading and booting from the drive may still work. It is also capable of taking SCSI storage devices, and with the presence of the right PCI cards, SATA, USB and FireWire storage devices.

SCSI: The presence of an onboard SCSI controller (the SCSI controller is codenamed MESH, for Macintosh Enhanced SCSI Hardware) and connectors permits the use of Mac-enabled SCSI scanners and storage devices, though this runs at only 5 MB/s.

Memory: Apple's spec sheets specify a maximum memory limit of 192 MiB, but independent testers have reported being able to use 3x256 MiB SDRAM chips, for a total of 768 MiB. Incompatibility has been reported with some DIMM modules in certain configurations- for example, newer single-sided PC‑133 RAM modules will not be detected correctly if they will be detected at all and if the machine can boot with them in place, and the desktop and all-in-one units required the use of low-profile RAM due to space constraints. It should be able to take 168-pin SDRAM of any speed, though it will run at PC66 speeds. The onboard video RAM can be upgraded from 2 MiB to 6 MiB with a 4 MiB SGRAM module (which runs at 83 MHz on Rev. A machines, and 100 MHz on Rev. B and C machines).

=== Blue and White model ===
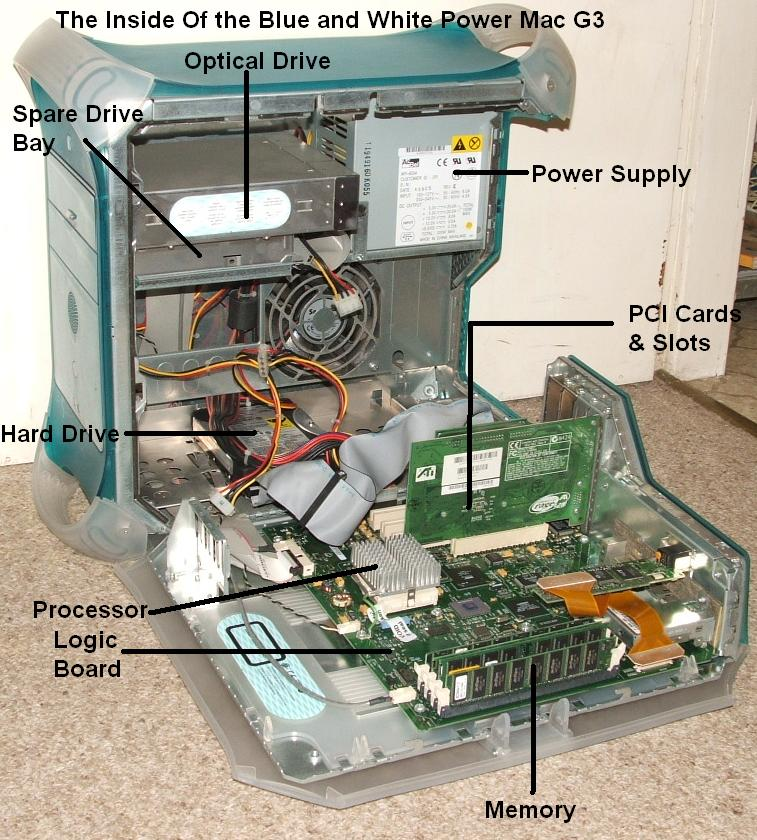
The inside of the Power Mac G3 (Blue and White)

The faster models (not the 300 MHz model) use the new copper-based PowerPC G3 CPUs made by IBM, which use about 25% less power of the Motorola versions clock for clock. The line ranged from 300 to 450 MHz. Despite its 100 MHz system bus and PC100 SDRAM, the 300 MHz B&W G3 performed worse than its 300 MHz Beige predecessor, because it has 512 KiB L2 cache, half of the 300 MHz Beige. The logic board has 4 PCI slots: 3 64-bit 33 MHz slots, and one 32-bit 66 MHz slot dedicated for the graphics card, an ATI Rage 128 with 16 MiB SGRAM. Four 100 MHz RAM slots accept PC100 SDRAM modules, allowing the installation of up to 1 GiB of RAM with the use of 256 MiB DIMMs. The onboard ATA was upgraded to Ultra ATA/33 (an extra UDMA-33 controller was also added), but SCSI was no longer present, having been replaced by 2 FireWire ports, a new standard (IEEE1394) running at 400 Mbit/s (50 MB/s) — faster in theory than even the ATA/33 (33 MB/s) hard drive controller. The serial ports were replaced with USB 1.1 ports (12 Mbit/s), and the floppy disk drive was removed altogether. The ADB port remained, as did the option for an internal modem. 100BASE-TX Ethernet became standard, and audio was moved back to the logic board. A Zip Drive remained an option, and some configurations included a DVD-ROM drive and a DVD-Video decoder daughtercard for the graphics card, allowing hardware-assisted DVD video playback.

The Blue and White G3 uses a modified version of the memory/PCI controller, the Motorola MPC106 (codenamed "Grackle"); it used the MPC106 v4. The I/O "Heathrow" had been replaced by "Paddington" (adding 100 Mbit Ethernet and power save features), the audio chip "Screamer" (on the beige G3's "Whisper" and "Wings" personality cards) had been replaced by "Burgundy" (from the "Bordeaux" personality card), and other controllers for Firewire (Texas Instruments PCI-Lynx), for USB etc. were added.

This is also the first Power Macintosh with the "New World" architecture which contained a small (approximately 1 MB) boot ROM. When booting the Mac OS, the Mac OS Toolbox and any other ROM patches installed are loaded into RAM (the former Beige G3 however was the first Mac with this ROM-in-RAM capability). Initially, many buyers chose to buy the older "Platinum" G3s instead, in order to maintain compatibility with existing peripherals.

Early "Revision 1" units have IDE controller problems related to the ATA/33 hard drive controller that made it impossible to connect two hard drives and prevented the use of newer drives. Using newer ATA drives in those units resulted in data transmission errors if the drives were connected to the on-board ATA/33 controller, the severity of the problem varying according to the particular make and model of the drive. Workarounds include replacing motherboards and employing the use of SCSI, Ultra ATA or SATA PCI controller cards. Stable operation can be achieved if the drive can be limited to Multi-Word DMA Mode 2 (disabling UDMA), although this limits throughput to 16 MB/s. Some hard drives support disabling UDMA in firmware through manufacturer-supplied utilities (generally DOS-based). Alternatively, the transfer mode can be limited to Multi-Word DMA Mode 2 through the use of third-party driver software such as FWB Hard Disk Toolkit.

The secondary ATA channel has also been reported to have issues with respect to flash upgrading certain DVD burners. Otherwise, it is generally held to be relatively stable.

Mac OS X attempts to avoid the UDMA issue by disabling UDMA on all affected G3 motherboards, but xlr8yourmac.com reported that reader Tim Seufert still found issues with single drives under Mac OS X. He reported that as of January 23, 2002, the fix would not be activated under Mac OS X when no slave drive was present.

The "Revision 2" units fixed the hard drive controller problem with an improved (UDMA-33) IDE controller that supported the standard IDE master/slave two-drive arrangement. This controller worked flawlessly with any drive within the 28-bit LBA constraint. Most Rev. 2 units shipped with a hard disk bracket designed for two drives (in fact Rev. 1 can hold up to three drives side-by-side, while Rev. 2 can hold up to four drives in two stacks, each with two drives) and also included a slightly updated version of the Rage 128 graphics card. The easiest way to tell if the unit is a Rev.2 is by looking at the CMD chip located on the logic board. The CMD chip on Rev. 1 logic boards is PCI646U2 and on Rev. 2 logic boards is 646U2-402.

Revision 2 350, 400, and 450 MHz units use the same motherboard as the first "Yikes" version of Power Mac G4 systems at 350 and 400 MHz ("Sawtooth" AGP-based G4s used a different board) and processor cards for these models are interchangeable. Note that if a G3's firmware has been upgraded (a required update for installing Mac OS 9), it won't accept G4 CPUs until patched with a third-party replacement firmware. A Blue and White G3 that has been upgraded to a G4 is able to run Mac OS X 10.5 Leopard.

==== Enclosure ====
The blue and white G3's enclosure design was widely praised at the time for being easy to open up and work on. The entire right side of the case is a door that hinges down by pulling a recessed latch at the top. No components need to be removed or unplugged, and the computer can remain running while opened. The logic board is positioned in the door, providing access to all components. Hard drives are mounted in a bracket affixed with one screw on the floor of the case. There is room for four internal hard drives and an internal fan is positioned at the side of the case to blow cooling air over them. Removable drives are in a more conventional position at the top of the case.

== Technical specifications ==
According to Apple, all of these models are obsolete. (Note: Apple products that have been discontinued for seven years and no longer receive hardware support or spare parts)

| Model | | Desktop | | | Mini Tower | | | | All-In-One | | Blue and White | | | |
|---|---|---|---|---|---|---|---|---|---|---|---|---|---|---|
| Codename | | "Gossamer" | | | | | | | "Artemis" | | "Yosemite" | | | |
| Timetable | Released | November 10, 1997 | | March 17, 1998 | November 10, 1997 | | March 17, 1998 | August 12, 1998 | March 31, 1998 | | January 5, 1999 | | | June 1, 1999 |
| Timetable | Discontinued | August 12, 1998 | December 14, 1998 | | July 7, 1998 | August 12, 1998 | December 14, 1998 | | September 1, 1998 | | June 1, 1999 | August 31, 1999 | | |
| Ordering info. | Identifier | Gestalt 510 | | | | | | | | | PowerMac1,1 | | | |
| Ordering info. | Model | M3979 | | | M4405 | | | | M4787 | | M5183 | | | |
| Ordering info. | Order number | M6141 | M6202 | M7105 | M6431 | M6142 | M6572 | M7107 | M6319 | M6321 | M6670 | M6668, M6666, M7556 | M6665, M7554, M7555 | M7553 |
| Display | | —N/a | | | | | | | 15-inch (38 cm) multiscan CRT, 1024 × 768 | | —N/a | | | |
| Performance | Processor | PowerPC 750 (G3) | | | | | | | | | | | | |
| Performance | Clock speed | 233 MHz | 266 MHz | 300 MHz | 233 MHz | 266 MHz | 300 MHz | 333 MHz | 233 MHz | 266 MHz | 300 MHz | 350 MHz | 400 MHz | 450 MHz |
| Performance | L1 Cache | 64 KB | | | | | | | | | | | | |
| Performance | L2 Cache backside | 512 KB | | 1 MB | 512 KB | | 1 MB | | 512 KB | | | 1 MB | | |
| Performance | Front side bus | 66.83 MHz (configurable to 70 MHz, 75 MHz or 83.3 MHz) | | | | | | | | | 100 MHz | | | |
| Performance | Graphics | ATI 3D Rage II+, 3D Rage Pro, or 3D Rage Pro Turbo with 2 MB of 83 MHz SGRAM (expandable to 6 MB) | | | | | | | ATI 3D Rage II+ or 3D Rage Pro with 2 MB of 100 MHz SGRAM (expandable to 6 MB) | | ATI Rage 128 GL with 16 MB of SDRAM | | | |
| Performance | Memory | 32 or 64 MB Low Profile PC66 SDRAM (expandable to 768 MB) | | | 64 or 128 MB PC66 SDRAM (expandable to 768 MB) | | | | 32 MB Low Profile PC66 SDRAM (expandable to 768 MB) | | 64 or 128 MB unbuffered PC100 SDRAM (expandable to 1 GB) | | | |
| Storage | Hard drive | 4 or 6 GB (ATA) | | | 4, 6, 8 or 9 GB (ATA) | | | | 4 or 6 GB (ATA) | | 6, 9, 12, 20, or 27 GB (Ultra ATA) | | | |
| Storage | Media | 24× CD-ROM / DVD-ROM; 1.44 MB floppy Optional Zip | | | | | | | 24× CD-ROM; 1.44 MB floppy Optional Zip | | 24× or 32× CD-ROM / 5× DVD-ROM; Optional Zip | | | |
| Connections | Expansion slots | 3 × PCI (32-bit); 1 × PERCH (either "Whisper", "Wings A/V", or "Bordeaux") | | | | | | | 3 × PCI (32-bit); 1 × PERCH (either "Whisper" or "Wings A/V") | | 3 × PCI (64-bit, 33 MHz); 1 × PCI for video card (64-bit, 66 MHz) | | | |
| Connections | Expansion bays | Two – for 3.5-inch SCSI devices | | | Addition of 5.25-inch or 3.5-inch SCSI or ATA devices supported | | | | —N/a | | | | | |
| Connections | Connectivity | 10 BASE-T Ethernet; Optional 56k modem | | | | | | | | | 10/100 BASE-T Ethernet; Optional 56k modem | | | |
| Connections | Input / Output | 1 × ADB; 2 × RS-422 serial (mini-DIN-8 connector, supports GeoPort and AppleTalk); 1 × SCSI (DB-25 connector); Mono speaker; 16-bit audio input and output (mini-jack connector, optional RCA connectors); 1 × video out (DA-15 connector) | | | | | | | 1 × ADB; 2 × RS-422 serial (mini-DIN-8 connector, supports GeoPort and AppleTalk); 1 × SCSI (DB-25 connector); Stereo speakers; 3 × 16-bit audio output (mini-jack connector); 1 × 16-bit audio input (mini-jack connector); 1 × video out (DA-15 connector) | | 1 × ADB; 2 × USB 1.1; 2 × Firewire 400; Mono speaker; 1 × audio output (mini-jack connector); 1 × audio input (mini-jack connector) | | | |
| Operating system | Minimum | Mac OS 8.0 | | | | | | | Mac OS 8.1 | | Mac OS 8.5.1 | | | Mac OS 8.6 |
| Operating system | Maximum | Mac OS X 10.2.8 "Jaguar" and Mac OS 9.2.2 | | | | | | | | | Mac OS X 10.4.11 "Tiger" and Mac OS 9.2.2 | | | |
| Weight | | 22.0 lb (10 kg) | | | 33.1 lb (15 kg) | | | | 59.5 lb (26.8 kg) | | 27.8 lb (13 kg) | | | |

== Supported operating systems ==
| OS release | Desktop and Mini Tower (Beige) | | | All-in-One | Blue and White | |
| OS release | Late 1997 | Early 1998 | Mid 1998 | Mid 1998 | Early 1999 | Mid 1999 |
|---|---|---|---|---|---|---|
| Mac OS 8 | Yes | Yes | Yes | 8.1 | 8.5 | 8.6 |
| Mac OS 9 | Yes | Yes | Yes | Yes | Yes | Yes |
| 10.0 Cheetah | Yes | Yes | Yes | Yes | Yes | Yes |
| 10.1 Puma | Yes | Yes | Yes | Yes | Yes | Yes |
| 10.2 Jaguar | Yes | Yes | Yes | Yes | Yes | Yes |
| 10.3 Panther | No | No | No | No | Yes | Yes |
| 10.4 Tiger | No | No | No | No | Yes | Yes |

== Timeline ==
Timeline of Power Macintosh models
See also: List of Mac models
