= BootX (Linux) =

Linux bootloader for Macintosh computers

BootX is a graphical bootloader developed by Benjamin Herrenschmidt, which runs as an application or an extension to Mac OS 8 and 9 that allows Old World Apple computers to dualboot Linux. It uses code derived from quik, a replacement boot loader for PCI-based Old World Apple computers using Open Firmware.

BootX requires a Linux kernel and compressed ramdisk image to be available in the Mac's system folder. It will then automatically choose which partition becomes the root partition.

== See also ==
- Comparison of bootloaders
- Quik, a replacement boot loader for loading Linux on PCI-based Old World Macs
- yaboot, a replacement boot loader for loading Linux on New World Macs
