= Yaboot =

Bootloader for Linux on PowerPC-based hardware

- Written in: C
- Platform: PowerPC
- Type: Bootloader
- License: GPLv2
- Website: yaboot.ozlabs.org
- Repository: github.com/yaboot/yaboot/

Yaboot (yet another boot loader) is a bootloader for PowerPC-based hardware running Linux.

== History ==
In 2009, maintenance by Paul Nasrat was handed over to Tony Breeds.

== Hardware support ==
Support includes the New World ROM Macintosh and IBM RS/6000 systems. It does not support the "OldWorld" PowerMacs.

== Booting procedure ==
It is built to run within the Open Firmware layer common to most such systems instead of working as a Mac OS 9 program like its predecessor BootX.

Yaboot is similar to LILO and GNU GRUB. Yaboot uses the following steps to boot:

1. Yaboot is invoked by Open Firmware
2. Finds a boot device, boot path and opens boot partition
3. Opens /etc/yaboot.conf or a command shell
4. Loads image or kernel and initrd
5. Executes image

== See also ==
- Comparison of boot loaders
