= Power Macintosh 4400 =

Personal computer by Apple

Power Macintosh 4400 / Power Macintosh 7220
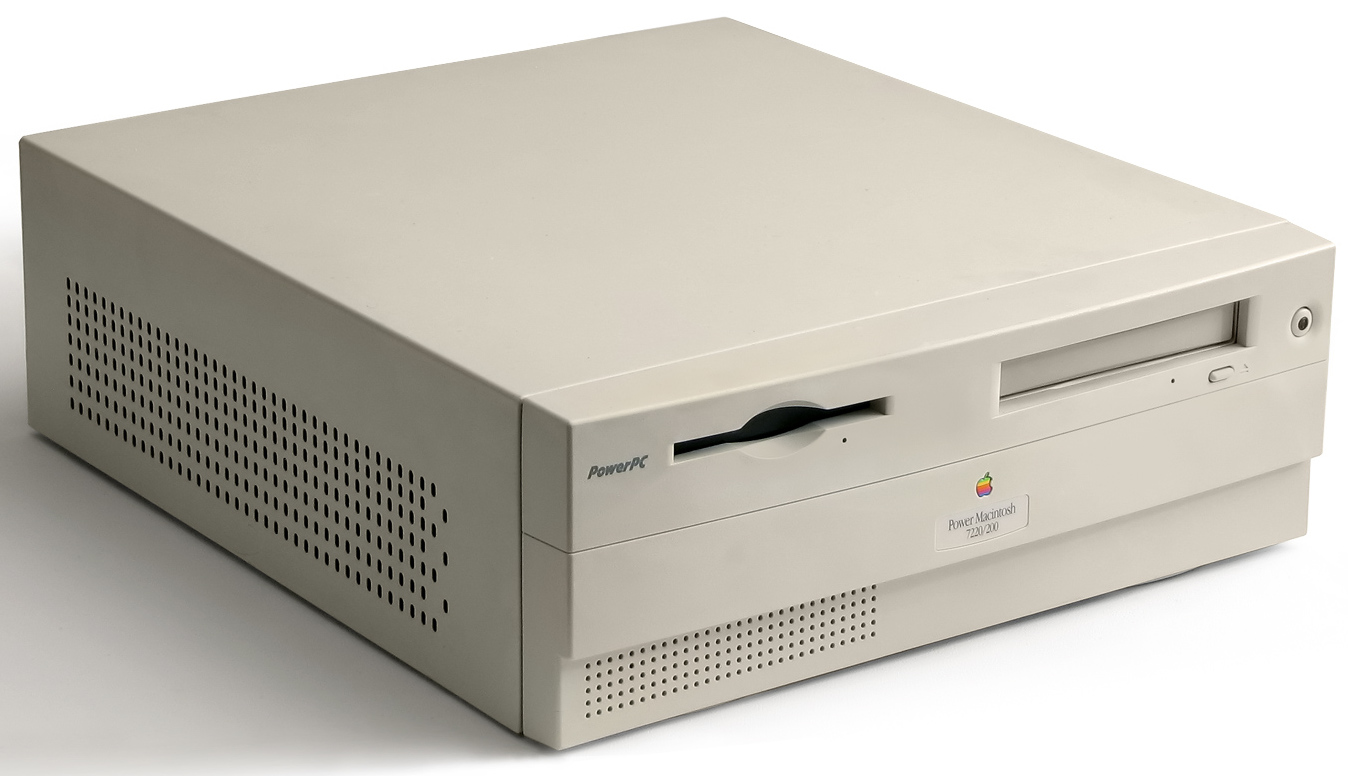
- Power Macintosh 7220/200
- Also known as: Cupid, Tanzania
- Developer: Apple Computer, Inc.
- Product family: Power Macintosh
- Type: Desktop
- Released: November 7, 1996
- Introductory price: US$1,700 (equivalent to $3,490 in 2025)
- Discontinued: February 1998
- Operating system: System 7.5.3 - Mac OS 9.1
- CPU: PowerPC 603e @ 160 or 200 MHz
- Memory: 16 MB, expandable to 160 MB (70 ns, 168-pin DIMM)
- Storage: 1.2 or 2 GB IDE hard drive
- Predecessor: Power Macintosh 7200
- Successor: Power Macintosh G3

The Power Macintosh 4400 (sold as the Power Macintosh 7220 in some markets) is a personal computer designed, manufactured, and sold by Apple Computer from November 1996 to February 1998. Unlike earlier desktop Macintosh models, it used several off-the-shelf components, including an IDE hard drive and an ATX-style power supply. The 4400 replaced the Power Macintosh 7200, the last remaining PowerPC 601-based system in Apple's product lineup.

The Power Macintosh 4400 was the only Apple computer to use the "Tanzania" logic board, which Apple developed for use in Macintosh clone systems. The 4400 used a conventional desktop PC case with an Apple-designed front panel. MacWEEK noted its industrial-style rear panel, sheet-metal interior, vertically mounted IDE hard drive, and riser card containing two PCI slots and a communications slot occupied by an Ethernet card. The magazine also noted that the power supply lacked automatic voltage switching, a cost-saving measure that required international users to account for differences in power standards.

The computer was positioned as a no-nonsense, low-frills computer for the small business market. Reviewers said that when Apple introduced faster and better looking models in late 1997, the 4400 became a less appealing option. The 4400 was discontinued several months after the introduction of the Power Macintosh G3, which was available at a comparable price and used Apple's Outrigger case design.

== Models ==
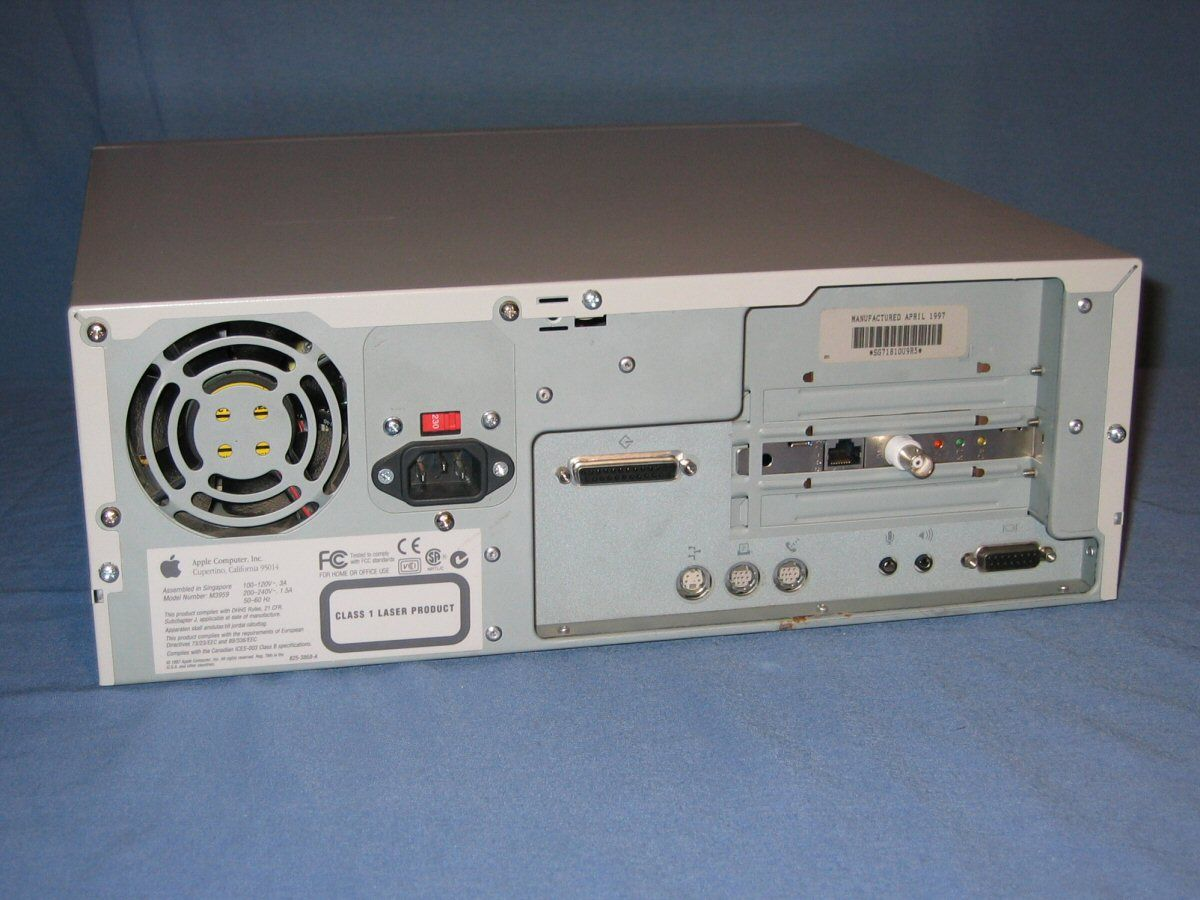
Rear view

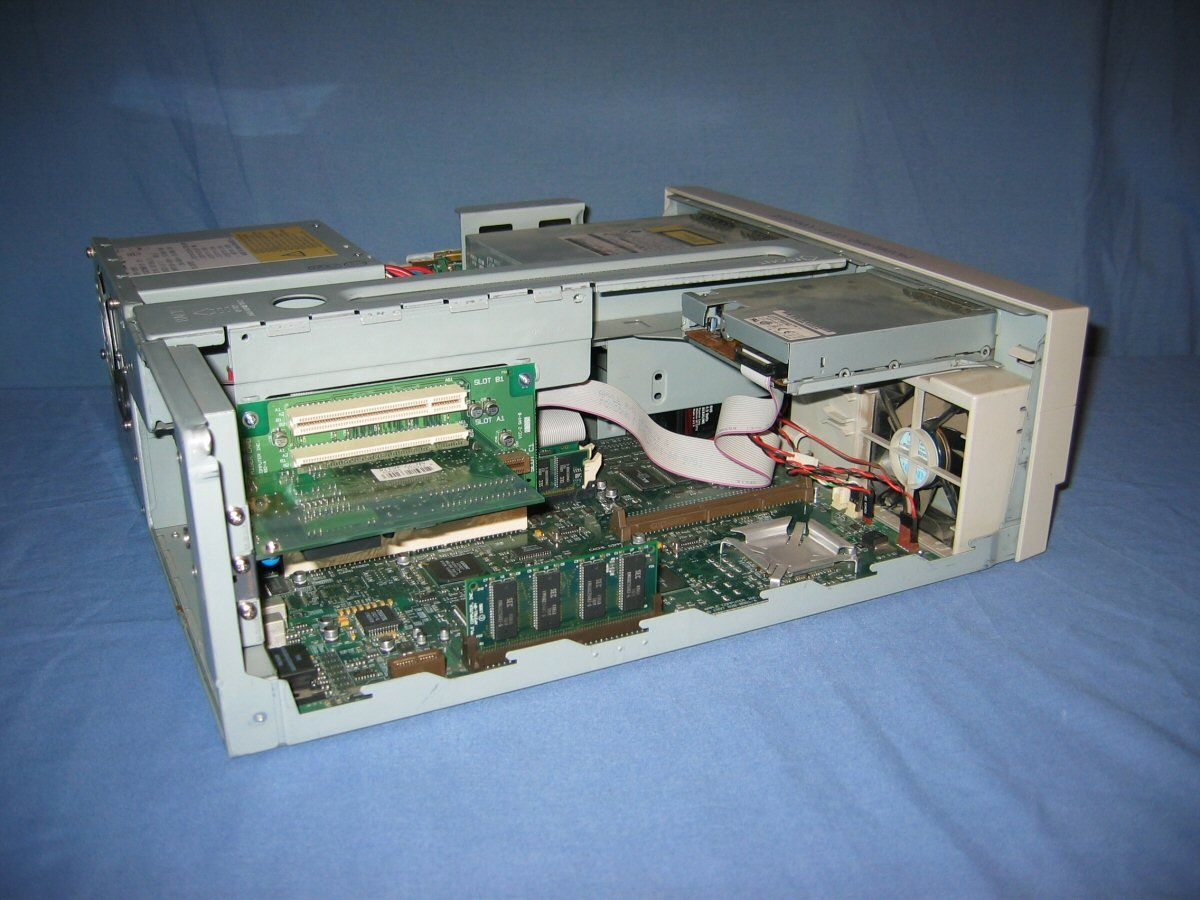
Internal view

The 4400/160 debuted as a Europe exclusive model on November 7, 1996. Some Apple documentation referred to the computer as the "Performa 4400", but no systems were labeled with that name. Apple retired the Performa brand several months later.

An model with a 200 MHz PowerPC 603e processor was introduced in the United States on February 17, 1997, as the Power Macintosh 4400/200. The computer could also run MS-DOS and Windows software through an optional PC Compatibility Card.

In some markets, Apple sold the computer under the Power Macintosh 7220 name rather than the 4400 in Asia and Australia.

Introduced November 7, 1996:

- Power Macintosh 4400/160: Sold in Europe, this model did not include an L2 cache or built-in Ethernet.

Introduced February 17, 1997:

The 200 MHz models supported a maximum of 160 MB of RAM and used an updated PCI adapter card with two PCI slots and one communications slot, replacing the three-PCI-slot configuration of the earlier model.

- Power Macintosh 4400/200: Sold worldwide except Asia and Australia.
- Power Macintosh 7220/200: Sold in Asia and Australia.

Introduced April 4, 1997:

- Power Macintosh 4400/200 PC Compatible: A 4400/200 bundled with a PC Compatibility Card, which allowed the computer to run MS-DOS and Windows 95. Sold worldwide except Asia and Australia.
- Power Macintosh 7220/200 PC Compatible: Same as the 4400/200 PC Compatible, sold in Asia and Australia.

== Timeline ==
Timeline of Power Macintosh models
See also: List of Mac models
