= New World ROM =

Firmware used in later PowerPC Macintosh models

New World ROM computers are PowerPC Macintosh models that do not use a Macintosh Toolbox ROM on the logic board. Due to Mac OS X not requiring the availability of the Toolbox, this allowed ROM sizes to shrink dramatically (typically from 4 MB to 1 MB), and facilitated the use of flash memory for system firmware instead of the now more expensive and less flexible Mask ROM that most previous Macs used. A facility for loading the Toolbox from the startup device was, however, made available, allowing the use of Mac OS 8 and Mac OS 9 on New World machines.

The New World architecture was developed for the Macintosh Network Computer, an unrealized project that eventually contributed several key technologies to the first-generation iMac.

All PowerPC Macs from the iMac, the iBook, the Blue and White Power Mac G3 and the Bronze Keyboard (Lombard) PowerBook G3 forward are New World ROM machines, while all previous PowerPC models (including all PCI-based Power Macs such as the Beige/Platinum Power Mac G3 and some NuBus-based Power Macs) are Old World ROM machines. Intel based Macs are incapable of running Mac OS 9 (or, indeed, any version of Mac OS X prior to Tiger), and on these machines EFI (later UEFI) is used instead of Open Firmware, which both New World and PowerPC Old World machines are based on.

New World ROM Macs are the first Macs where direct usage of the Open Firmware (OF) subsystem is encouraged. Previous PCI Power Macs used Open Firmware for booting, but the implementation was not complete; in these machines OF was only expected to probe PCI devices, then immediately hand control over to the Mac OS ROM. Because of this, versions 1.0.5 and 2.x had several serious bugs, as well as missing functionality (such as being able to load files from a HFS partition or a TFTP server). Apple also set the default input and output devices to ttya (the modem port on beige Macs), which made it difficult for normal users to get to Open Firmware; to do so it was necessary to either hook up a terminal, or change the Open Firmware settings from inside Mac OS using a tool such as Boot Variables or Apple's System Disk.

The New World ROM introduced a much-improved version of the Open Firmware interpreter, version 3.0, which added many missing features, fixed most of the bugs from earlier versions, and had the capability to run CHRP boot scripts. The Toolbox ROM was embedded inside a CHRP script in the System Folder called "Mac OS ROM", along with a short loader stub and a copy of the Happy Mac icon suitable for display from Open Firmware. Once the ROM was loaded from disk, the Mac boot sequence continued as usual. As before, Open Firmware could also run a binary boot loader, and version 3.0 added support for ELF objects as well as the XCOFF files versions 1.0.5 and 2.0 supported. Also, version 3.0 (as well as some of the last releases of version 2.x, starting with the PowerBook 3400) officially supported direct access to the Open Firmware command prompt from the console (by setting the auto-boot? variable to false from Mac OS, or by holding down ⌘ Command-⌥ Option-O-F at boot).

One major difference between Old World ROM Macs and New World ROM Macs, at least in Classic Mac OS, is that the Gestalt selector for the machine type is no longer usable; all New World ROM Macs use the same mach ID, 406 decimal, and the actual machine ID is encoded in the "model" and "compatible" properties of the root node of the Open Firmware device tree. The New World ROM also sets the "compatible" property of the root node to "MacRISC2" (machines that can boot Classic Mac OS using "Mac OS ROM") or "MacRISC3" (machines that can only boot Mac OS X or another Unix-like system).

It is somewhat easier to boot a non-Mac-OS operating system on a New World system, and indeed OpenBSD's bootloader only works on a New World system.

The simplest way to distinguish a New World ROM Mac is that it will have a factory built-in USB port. No Old World ROM Mac had a USB port as factory equipment; instead, they used ADB for keyboard and mouse, and mini-DIN-8 "modem" and "printer" serial ports for other peripherals. Also, New World ROM Macs generally do not have a built-in floppy drive.
