= Power Macintosh =

Family of personal computers released by Apple Computer

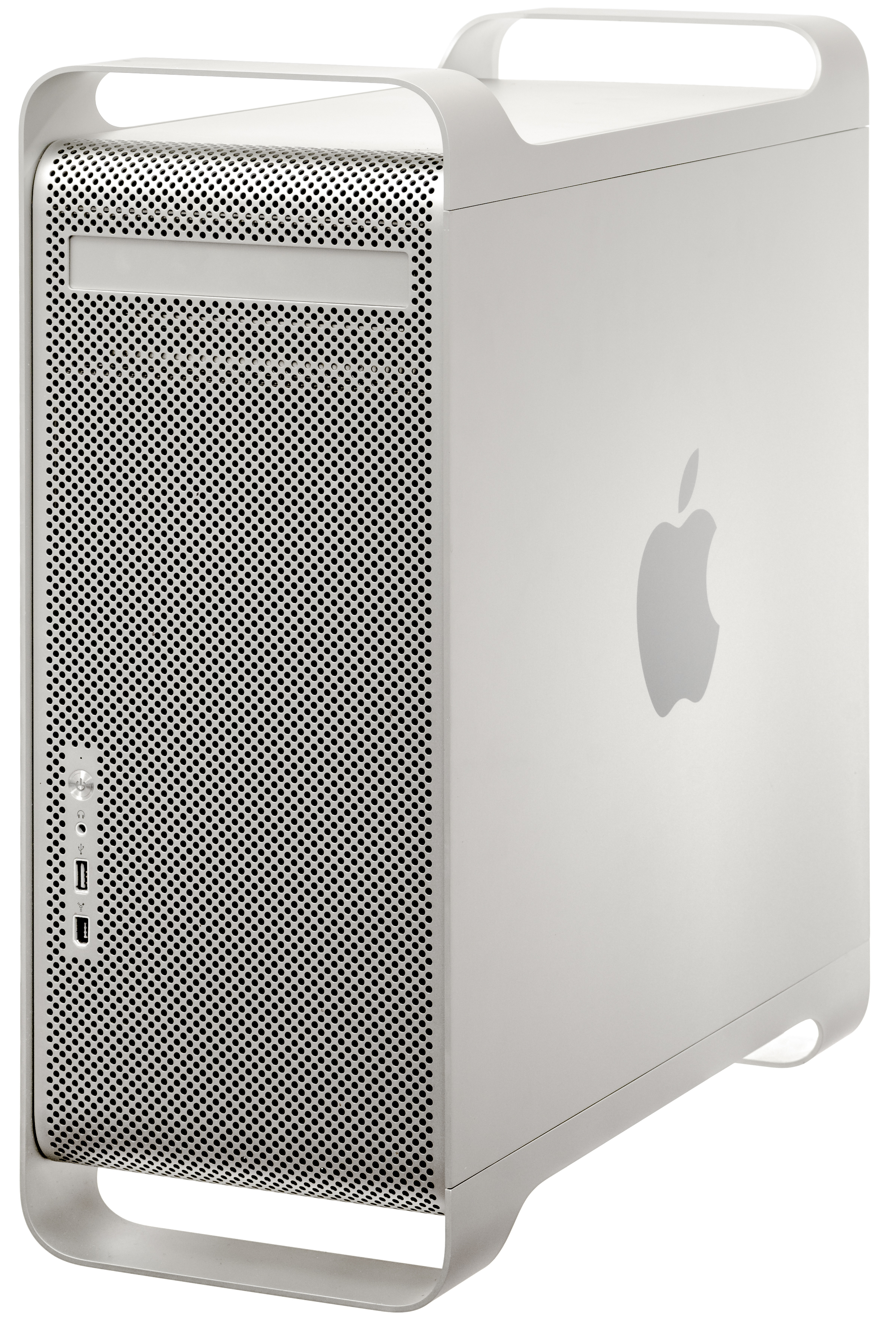
- Power Mac G5, the last Power Mac
- Developer: Apple Computer
- Product family: Macintosh
- Type: Desktop
- Released: March 14, 1994
- Discontinued: August 7, 2006
- Operating system: Mac OS
- Predecessor: Macintosh Quadra, Macintosh Centris, Macintosh II
- Successor: Mac Pro
- Related: PowerBook, Mac Pro

The Power Macintosh, later Power Mac, is a family of personal computers designed, manufactured, and sold by Apple Computer, Inc. as the core of the Macintosh brand from March 1994 until August 2006.

Described by Macworld as "the most important technical evolution of the Macintosh since the Mac II debuted in 1987", it is the first computer with the PowerPC CPU architecture, the flagship product of the AIM alliance. Existing software for the Motorola 68k processors of previous Macintoshes do not run on it natively, so a Mac 68k emulator is in System 7.1.2. It provides good compatibility, at about two-thirds of the speed of contemporary Macintosh Quadra machines.

The Power Macintosh replaced the Quadra and was initially sold in the same enclosures. Over the next twelve years, it evolved through a succession of enclosure designs, a rename to "Power Mac", five major generations of PowerPC chips, and a great deal of press coverage, design accolades, and controversy about performance claims. It was discontinued as part of the Mac transition to Intel processors announced in 2005, making way for its replacement, the Mac Pro.

== History ==
The first public demonstration of the new Power Macintosh — specifically, a prototype of what would become the Power Macintosh 6100 – was at an Apple Pacific sales meeting in Hawaii in October 1992. The demo was a success, and in the following months, the product plan expanded to include three models: the entry-level 6100, a mid-range 7100 housed in the Macintosh IIvx's desktop case, and a high-end 8100 based on the Quadra 800's mini-tower case. A fourth project, the Macintosh Processor Upgrade Card, was started in July 1993 to provide a straightforward upgrade path to owners of Centris- and Quadra-based Macintosh computers. The importance of this was especially significant for the Quadra 700, 900, and 950, which were not going to receive full logic board replacements. Computers upgraded in this fashion received new names such as "Power Macintosh Q650" and "Power Macintosh 900".

=== Release and reception (1994–1995) ===
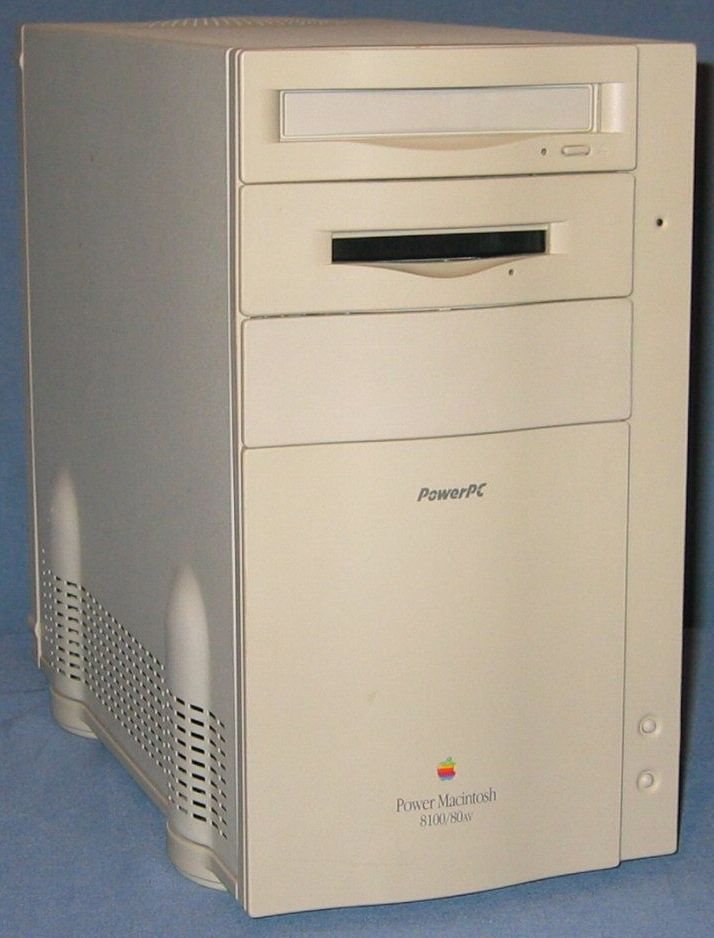
Front view of a Power Macintosh 8100/80AV, the most powerful first-generation Power Macintosh

The original plan was to release the first Power Macintosh machine on January 24, 1994, exactly ten years after the release of the first Macintosh. Ian Diery, who was EVP and general manager of the Personal Computer Division at the time, moved the release date back to March 14 in order to give manufacturing enough time to build enough machines to fill the sales channels and to ensure that the Macintosh Processor Upgrade Card would be available at the same time. This was a departure from prior practice at Apple; they had typically released upgrade packages months after the introduction of new Macintoshes.

The Power Macintosh was formally introduced at the Lincoln Center for the Performing Arts in Manhattan on March 14. Pre-orders for the new Power Macintosh models were brisk, with an announced 150,000 machines already having been sold by that date. MacWorld's review of the 6100/60 noted that "Not only has Apple finally regained the performance lead it lost about eight years ago when PCs appeared using Intel's 80386 CPU, but it has pushed far ahead." The performance of 680x0 software is slower due to the emulation layer, but MacWorld's benchmarks showed noticeably faster CPU, disk, video, and floating-point performance than the Quadra 610 it replaced. By January 1995, Apple had sold 1 million Power Macintosh systems.

Speed-bumped versions of the Power Macintosh line were introduced at the beginning of 1995, followed in April by the first PowerPC 603 models: an all-in-one model called the Power Macintosh 5200 LC and a replacement for the Quadra 630 called the Power Macintosh 6200. Performa variants of these machines were sold as well, continuing the practice of re-branding other Macintosh models for sale in department stores and big-box electronics retailers. While the 5200 LC was well received by critics for its design, performance, and cost, both it and the 6200 suffered from stability issues (and in the case of the 5200, display issues as well) that could only be solved by bringing the machine to an Apple dealer for replacement parts.

By mid-1995, the burgeoning Power Macintosh line had all but completely supplanted every prior Macintosh line, with only the high-end Quadra 950 and two low-cost education models (the all-in-one Macintosh LC 580 and desktop LC 630) remaining in production. The competitive marketplace for "accelerator cards" that had existed for earlier Macintosh systems largely disappeared due to the comparatively low price of Apple's Macintosh Processor Upgrade Card (US$600). DayStar Digital sold upgrade cards for the IIci and various Quadra models, and full motherboard replacements were available from Apple as well. Macintosh clones from companies like DayStar Digital and Power Computing were also coming to the market at this time, undercutting Apple's prices.

=== Transition to standardized hardware (1995–1999) ===
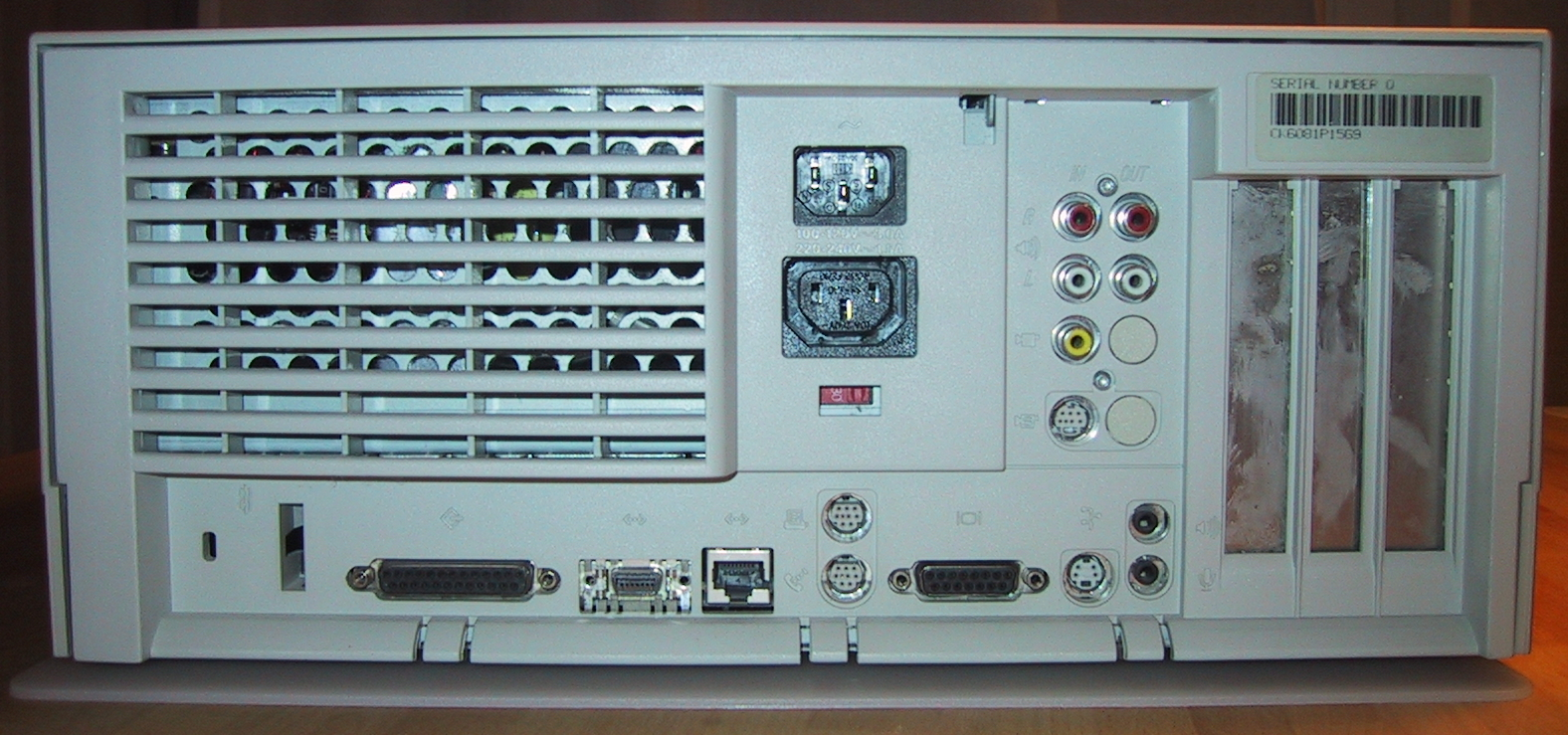
Rear view of a Power Macintosh 7500/100

When the Power Macintosh was introduced, it included the same internal and external expansion connections as other Macintosh models, all of which (save for audio input and output) were either wholly proprietary to, or largely exclusive to Apple computers. Over the next five years, Apple replaced all these ports with industry-standard connectors.

The first generation of Power Macintoshes had shipped with NuBus, but by the end of 1993, it was becoming clear that Intel's PCI bus was going to be the widely adopted future of internal expansion. Apple's position as a relatively small player in the larger personal computer market meant that few device manufacturers invested in creating both NuBus- and PCI-compatible versions of their cards. The first PCI-based system was the range-topping Power Macintosh 9500, introduced in May 1995. This was followed shortly afterwards by the introduction of the "Power Surge" line of second-generation Power Macintosh systems – the Power Macintosh 7200, 7500 and 8500. The 8500 and 9500 were built around the new PowerPC 604, offering speeds starting at 120 MHz. InfoWorld's review of the 8500 showed a speed improvement in their "business applications suite" benchmark from 10 minutes with the 8100/100, to 7:37 for the 8500/120. They also noted that the 8500 runs an average of 24 to 44 percent faster than a similarly clocked Intel Pentium chip, increasing to double on graphics and publishing tasks.

The transition to PCI continued into 1996, with the introduction of the all-in-one 5400, desktop 6300/160 (usually sold as a Performa 6360), and mini-tower 6400 models. The success of the Macintosh clone market also prompted Apple to produce its own inexpensive machine using parts and production techniques that were common in both the clone market and the Wintel desktop market at the time. The Power Macintosh 4400 (sold as a 7220 in Asia and Australia) employed bent sheet metal instead of plastic for its case internals, and included a standard ATX power supply.

Alongside the transition to PCI, Apple began a gradual transition away from SCSI hard disks to IDE as a cost-saving measure, both for themselves and for users who wanted to upgrade their hard drives. The low-end 5200 and 6200 were the first to adopt IDE internal drives, though Apple's proprietary 25-pin external SCSI connector remained. The beige Power Macintosh G3 models being the last to include SCSI drives as standard, and it was the last Macintosh to include the external SCSI connector. When the Power Macintosh G3 (Blue and White) was introduced in early 1999, the port was replaced by two FireWire 400 ports. The Blue and White G3 was also the last Macintosh to include Apple Desktop Bus ports, a proprietary technology created by Steve Wozniak to connect keyboards, mice and software protection dongles such as those from Avid Technology. Two USB ports were also included, making this the only Power Macintosh to include both ADB and USB.

Another port that was retired during this time is the Apple Attachment Unit Interface. This was a proprietary version of the industry-standard Attachment Unit Interface connector for 10BASE5 Ethernet that Apple had created to avoid confusion with the 15-pin connector that Apple used for connecting external displays. The AAUI port required a costly external transceiver to connect to a network. By the early 1990s, the networking industry was coalescing around the 10BASE-T connector, leading Apple to include this port alongside AAUI in mid-1995, starting with the Power Macintosh 9500. The Power Macintosh G3 excluded the AAUI port.

The Power Mac G4 (AGP Graphics) was released in the second half of 1999; it was the first Power Macintosh to include only industry-standard internal and external expansion. For some years afterwards, a number of third parties created dongles that provided backwards compatibility to users of newer Power Mac systems with old hardware. This included companies like Griffin Technology, MacAlly Peripherals, Rose Electronics and many others. In some cases, these companies produced adapters that matched the aesthetic design of the Power Mac.

=== Industrial design and the Megahertz Myth (1999–2002) ===
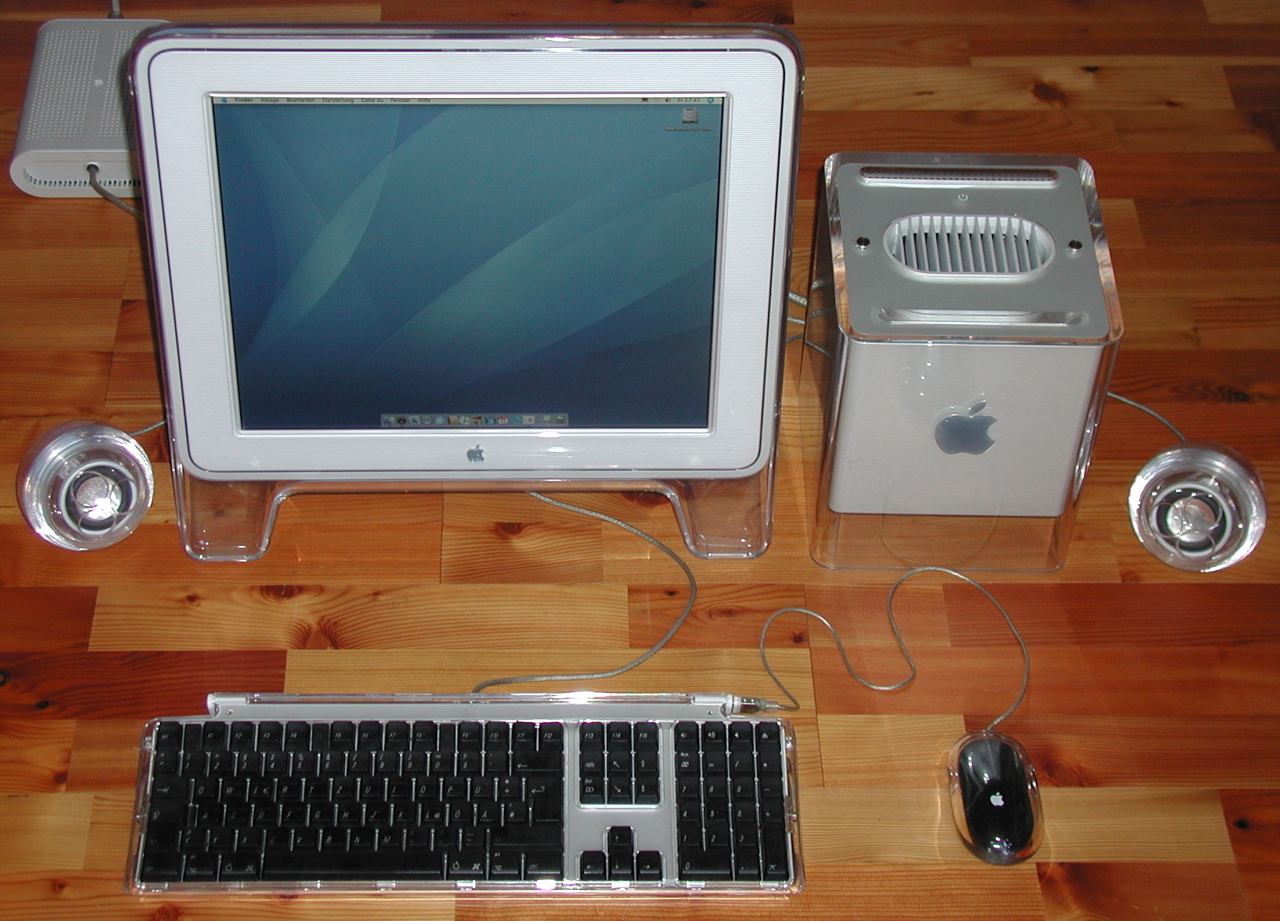
A complete Power Mac G4 Cube system, including a 17" Apple Studio Display, Harman Kardon speakers, keyboard, and mouse

Shortly after Steve Jobs' return to Apple in 1997, Jony Ive was appointed senior vice president of industrial design. Building on the critical and commercial success of the iMac, Ive and his team created an entirely new case design for the Power Macintosh G3, combining many of the aesthetic principles of the iMac (curves, translucent plastics, use of color) with the ease-of-access characteristics of the company's popular "Outrigger" Macintosh models from previous years. The result was the Power Macintosh G3 (Blue and White), a machine that received considerable plaudits from reviewers, including PC Magazine's Technical Excellence Award for 1999. "The Power Mac provides the fastest access to the insides of a computer we've ever seen," they wrote. "Just lift a handle and a hinged door reveals everything inside." This case design, code-named "El Capitan", was retained through the entire lifetime of the Power Mac G4. The introduction of the Blue and White G3 mini-tower also marked the end of the desktop and all-in-one Power Macintosh case designs, the latter being replaced by the iMac.

A second model called the Power Mac G4 Cube was introduced in 2000, which fitted the specifications of a mid-range Power Mac G4 into a cube less than 9" in each axis. This model was on sale for about a year before being discontinued, and was not considered a sales success (150,000 units were sold, about one-third of Apple's projections), but the distinctive design of both the computer and its accompanying Harman Kardon speakers prompted the Museum of Modern Art in New York City to retain them in their collection.

The PowerPC chips in the G3 and G4 became a central part of Apple's branding and marketing for the Power Macintosh. For example, the Blue and White G3 features the letters "G3" on the side that are fully one-third the height of the entire case, a significant departure from the small labels typically used on prior Macintosh computers. And when the Power Mac G4 was introduced, print ads included pictures of the G4 chip and mentioned its AltiVec instruction set by its own marketing name, "Velocity Engine". A related element of Apple's marketing strategy, especially after mid-2001, was to highlight what they described as the "Megahertz myth", challenging the belief that a processor's clock speed is directly correlated with performance. This had become important with the introduction of Intel's Pentium 4, which featured significantly higher clock speeds than competing chips from Sun, IBM, and AMD, but without a corresponding performance benefit.

The company's public presentations – Stevenotes in particular – often featured lengthy segments pitting a high-powered Compaq or Dell computer against the Power Macintosh in a series of benchmarks and scripted tasks, usually in Adobe Photoshop. These presentations often showed the Power Macintosh besting Intel's Pentium chips by margins significantly exceeding 50%, but independent benchmarks did not bear this out. InfoWorld reviewer Jennifer Plonka reported that the 400 MHz G3 was 11% slower than a comparably-specced Pentium II-450 in an Office applications suite test, while Photoshop 5.0 was faster by 26%. And in 2003, Maximum PC ran a variety of gaming, Photoshop and LightWave 3D benchmarks, and reported that the Dual 1.25 GHz G4 system was about half the speed of a dual-processor Intel Xeon Prestonia 2.8 GHz system. A related criticism leveled at Power Mac systems from this time, particularly the G4 Mirrored Drive Doors, was the increased fan noise level compared to older systems.

=== The Power Mac G5 and the end of the Power Mac (2003–2006) ===
By the time the Power Mac G5 was unveiled at Apple's Worldwide Developers Conference in July 2003, Apple's desktop range had fallen significantly behind competing computers in performance. The G5 closed much of this gap by moving to the PowerPC 970 processor with clock speeds up to 2.0 GHz, and a full 64-bit architecture. It also introduced a significantly revised enclosure design, replacing the use of plastics with anodized aluminum alloy.

Reviews were generally positive. InfoWorld described the G5 as "Apple's best work yet", and said it "delivers on the present need for rapid computing, deep multitasking, and responsive user interfaces — as well as the future need for mainstream computers that rapidly process and analyze massive data sets." PC Magazine again awarded the Power Mac G5 with its Award for Technical Excellence for 2003. However, the G5's heavy weight (10 pounds more than the previous year's Quicksilver Power Mac G4), limited internal expansion options, issues with ground loop, and noise in the single-processor models' power supply units resulted in significant criticism of the product. Apple also continued to make unsubstantiated performance claims about the new Power Mac. This resulted in the Advertising Standards Authority for the United Kingdom banning Apple from using the phrase "the world's fastest, most powerful personal computer" to describe the Power Mac G5 after independent tests carried out by the Broadcast Advertising Clearance Centre determined the claim to be false. Another claim made by Steve Jobs at the 2003 Worldwide Developers Conference was that the company would be selling a 3 GHz G5 by mid-2004; this never happened.

Three generations of Power Mac G5 were released before it was discontinued during the Mac transition to Intel processors. The announcement of the transition came in mid-2005, but the third generation of G5 systems was introduced towards the end of 2005. Most notably in this generation was the introduction of a Quad-core 2.5 GHz system. Not only was this the first Apple computer with four processing cores, it was the first to incorporate PCI Express instead of PCI-X for internal expansion. It also required an IEC 60320 C19 power connector that was more common on rackmounted server hardware, instead of the industry-standard C13 connector used with personal computers.

The official end to the Power Macintosh line came at the 2006 Worldwide Developers Conference, where Phil Schiller introduced its replacement, the Mac Pro. The G5's enclosure design was retained for the Mac Pro and continued to be used for seven more years, making it among the longest-lived designs in Apple's history.

== Models ==
The Power Macintosh model lineup can be broadly divided into two periods, before and after Apple's introduction of its "four-quadrant" product simplification strategy in 1998.

From 1994 to 1998, Apple sold Power Macintosh models in five form factors: full tower, mini-tower, desktop, compact desktop, and all-in-one. Early models largely reused case designs from earlier Macintosh product lines, which were subsequently redesigned for newer models.

After 1998, the lineup was consolidated around the mini-tower form factor, while the iMac took over the all-in-one segment. The Power Mac G4 Cube, sold in 2000 and 2001, was an exception to this approach.

=== 1994–1997 ===
The early Power Macintosh models can be divided into two hardware generations. The first uses the PowerPC 601 or PowerPC 603 processor and retains the NuBus and PDS expansion interfaces used in earlier Macintosh models. The second uses the faster PowerPC 603e, PowerPC 604 or PowerPC 604e processor and replaces these interfaces with industry-standard PCI slots as well as make use of Open Firmware, allowing them to more easily boot alternate operating systems (including Mac OS X via XPostFacto), though use of various hacks was still necessary. These hardware generations did not correspond directly to changes in case design, as Apple updated processors and expansion architecture independently of its enclosures.

Apple's naming scheme used the first digit of a model number to identify its case series: 9 for full towers, 8 for mini-towers, 7 for traditional desktop cases, 6 for compact desktops, 5 for all-in-one designs, and 4 for low-cost desktops. Within each series, higher model numbers generally indicated newer models or additional features. A number following a slash indicated the processor's clock speed.

The first Power Macintosh models, introduced in 1994, reused case designs from earlier Macintosh product lines. The Power Macintosh 6100 used the compact "pizza box" case of the Macintosh Quadra 610, the Power Macintosh 7100 used the desktop case of the Macintosh IIvx, and the Power Macintosh 8100 used the case of the Macintosh Quadra 800.

New case designs appeared across several form factors in 1995. The Power Macintosh 5200 introduced a new all-in-one enclosure, the Power Macintosh 6200 a new compact desktop enclosure, and the Power Macintosh 7200 the "Outrigger" desktop enclosure.

In 1997, the Power Macintosh 8600 and Power Macintosh 9600 introduced a new enclosure design shared between the mini-tower and full-tower form factors.

Models with "AV" in their names include enhanced audio and video capabilities. Models with "MP" in their names include two processors.

Models with "DOS Compatible" or "PC Compatible" in their names included an installed DOS Compatibility Card or PC Compatibility Card with an x86-compatible processor, typically an Intel i486 or Pentium or a compatible Cyrix processor. These models could run MS-DOS and Microsoft Windows, typically Windows 3.1 on models introduced before 1995 and Windows 95 on later models.

==== Full tower ====
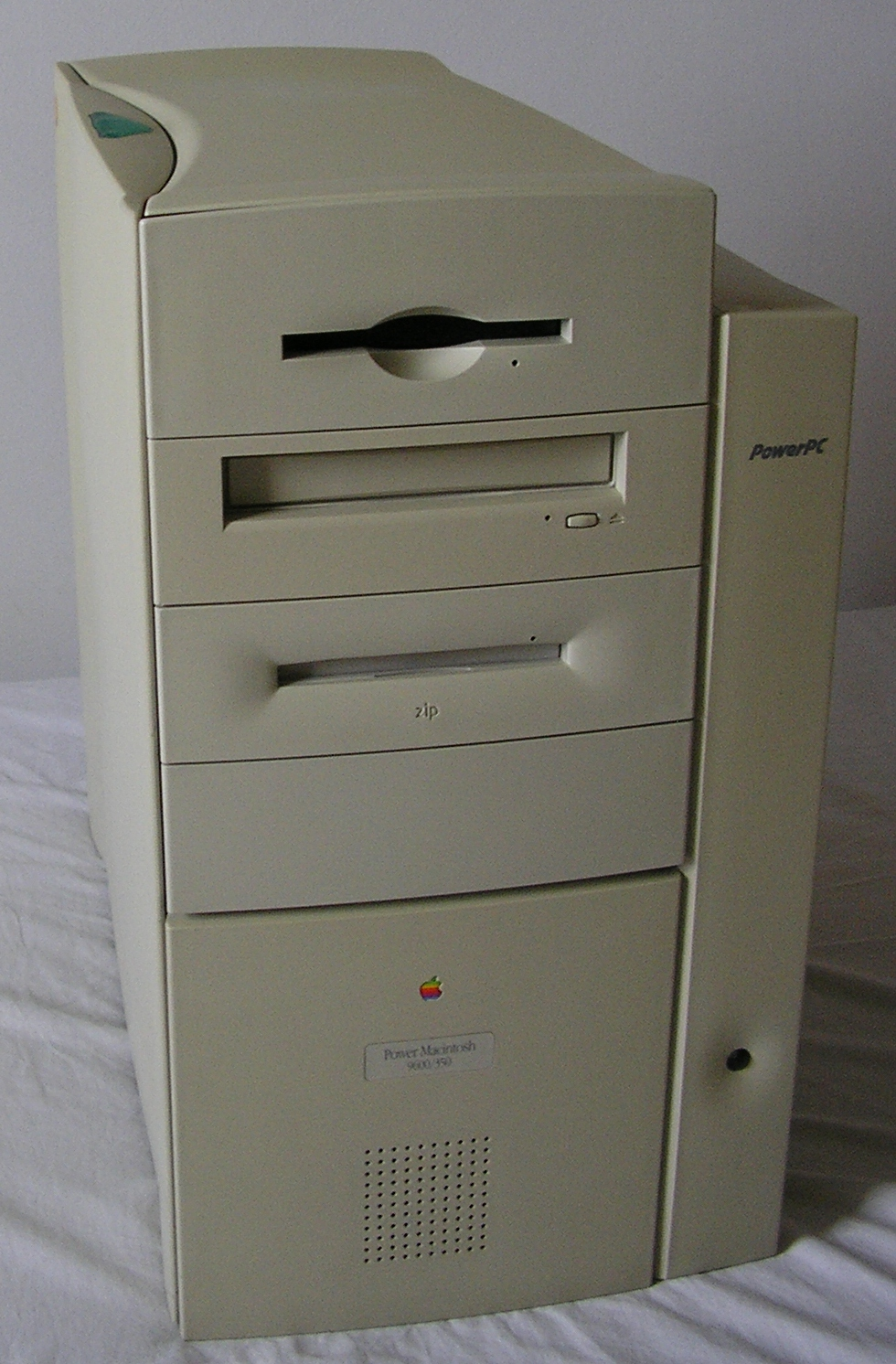
The tower design used by the 8600/9600 series

The full-tower models used the same basic case design as the mini-tower models, but provided additional expansion slots and lacked built-in video output, which was supplied through an expansion card. The first Power Macintosh 9500 models used an extended version of the Quadra 800 enclosure, while the Power Macintosh 9600 introduced a redesigned case shared with the mini-tower models.

- Power Macintosh 9500/120, 132, 150, 180MP, 200 (marketed as the Power Macintosh 9515/132 in some regions)
- Power Macintosh 9600/200, 200MP, 233, 300, 350

==== Mini-tower ====
The mini-tower models used a vertical case design intended to be placed beside a monitor. The first models reused the Quadra 800 enclosure, while the Power Macintosh 8600 introduced a redesigned case shared with the full-tower models. The Power Macintosh 6400 used a different, smaller case.

- Power Macintosh 6400/180, 200
- Power Macintosh 6500/225, 250, 275, 300
- Power Macintosh 8100/80, 80AV, 100, 100AV, 110, 110AV
- Power Macintosh 8115/110
- Power Macintosh 8200/100, 120
- Power Macintosh 8500/120, 132, 150, 180
- Power Macintosh 8515/120
- Power Macintosh 8600/200, 250, 300

==== Desktop ====
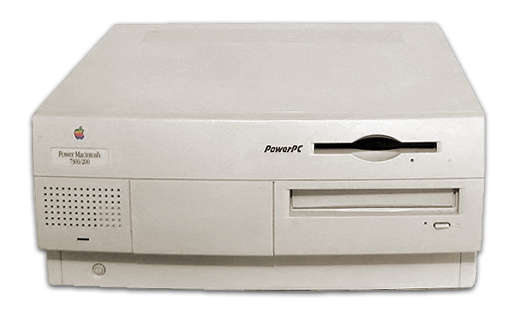
The "Outrigger" desktop design

The traditional desktop models used horizontally oriented cases designed to sit beneath a monitor. The first models reused the Macintosh IIvx enclosure, while the Power Macintosh 7200 introduced the redesigned Outrigger case. The Power Macintosh 4400 used a low-cost desktop case.

- Power Macintosh 4400/160, 200, 200 (PC Compatible) (marketed as the Power Macintosh 7220 in some regions)
- Power Macintosh 7100/66, 66AV, 80, 80AV
- Power Macintosh 7200/75, 90, 120 (PC), 200 (PC)
- Power Macintosh 7300/166, 180 (PC), 200
- Power Macintosh 7500/100
- Power Macintosh 7600/120, 132, 200

==== Compact desktop ====
The compact desktop models used low-profile horizontal cases designed to sit beneath a monitor. The Power Macintosh 6100 used the pizza-box case of the Macintosh Quadra 610, while the Power Macintosh 6200 and Power Macintosh 6300 used the larger Macintosh Quadra 630 enclosure.

- Power Macintosh 6100/60, 60AV, 66, 66AV, 66 (DOS Compatible)
- Power Macintosh 6200/75
- Power Macintosh 6300/120, 160

==== All-in-one ====
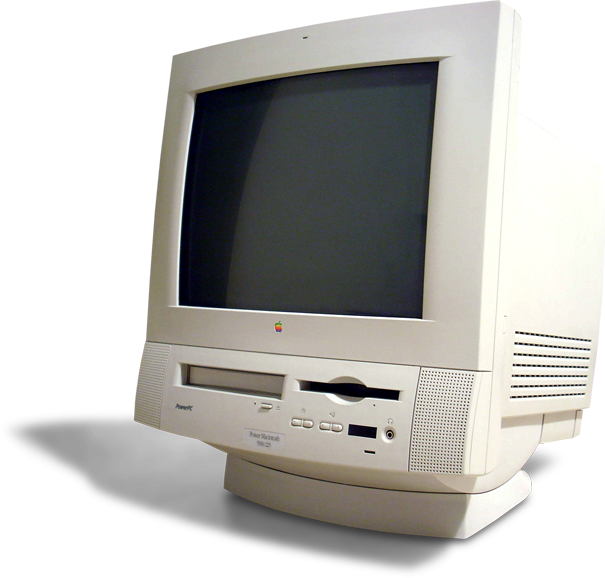
The all-in-one design

The all-in-one models integrated the computer and display into a single enclosure. The Power Macintosh 5200 series used internal designs similar to the Macintosh Quadra 630. These models are sometimes grouped with the Performa 5000 series.

- Power Macintosh 5200 LC/75
- Power Macintosh 5260/100, 120
- Power Macintosh 5300 LC/100
- Power Macintosh 5400/120, 180, 200
- Power Macintosh 5500/225, 250

=== 1997–2006 ===
Power Macintosh G3 Mini Tower and Blue and White

Starting with the Power Macintosh G3, Apple changed its product naming to include the generation of PowerPC CPU, with the name of the form factor or a key feature afterwards in brackets.

The all-in-one models would eventually be spun off into the iMac line, whilst the compact form factor models would be spun off into the Mac Mini.

==== Power Macintosh G3 ====
- Power Macintosh G3 Desktop
- Power Macintosh G3 Mini Tower
- Power Macintosh G3 All-In-One
- Power Macintosh G3 Blue and White

==== Power Mac G4 ====
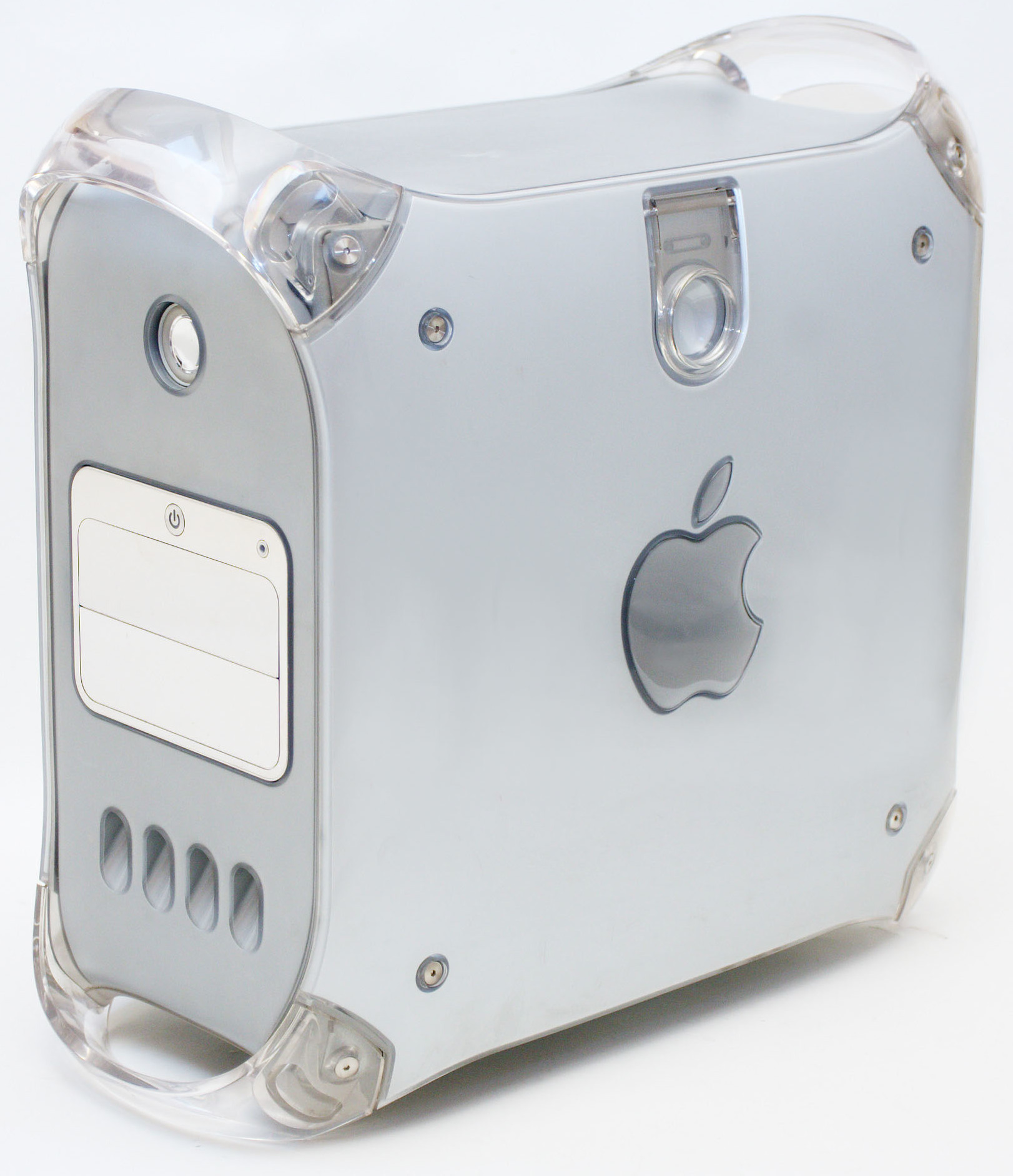
Power Mac G4 (Mirrored Drive Doors)

- Power Mac G4 PCI Graphics
- Power Mac G4 AGP Graphics
- Power Mac G4 Gigabit Ethernet
- Power Mac G4 Digital Audio
- Power Mac G4 Quicksilver
- Power Mac G4 Quicksilver 2002
- Power Mac G4 Mirrored Drive Doors
- Power Mac G4 Mirrored Drive Doors FW800
- Power Mac G4 Mirrored Drive Doors 2003
- Power Mac G4 Cube

==== Power Mac G5 ====
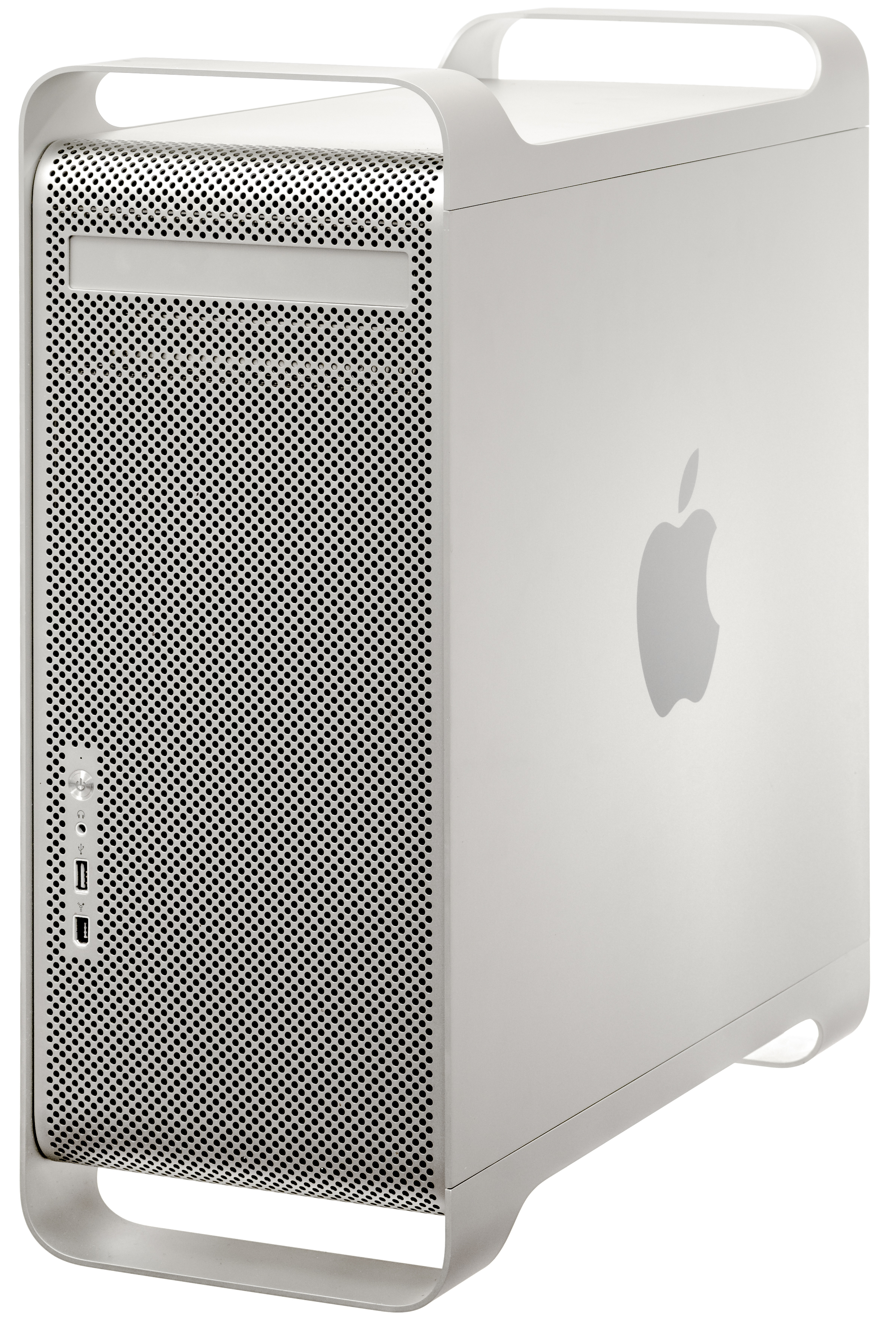
Power Macintosh G5 Dual Core (2.3 GHz) Late 2005

The Power Mac G5's name was changed to incorporate the time period in which the model was released.

- Power Mac G5 Mid 2003
- Power Mac G5 Mid 2004
- Power Mac G5 Late 2004
- Power Mac G5 Early 2005
- Power Mac G5 Late 2005

== Naming ==
The Power Mac brand name was used for Apple's high-end tower style computers, targeted primarily at businesses and creative professionals, in differentiation to their more compact "iMac" line (intended for home use) and the "eMac" line (for the education markets). They were usually equipped with Apple's newest technologies, and commanded the highest prices among Apple desktop models. Some Power Mac G4 and G5 models were offered in dual-processor configurations.

Prior to the Power Mac name change, certain Power Macintosh models were otherwise identical to their lower-cost re-branded siblings sold as the Macintosh LC and Macintosh Performa, as well as the dedicated Apple Workgroup Server and Macintosh Server G3 & G4 lines. Other past Macintosh lines which used PowerPC processors include the PowerBook 5300 and later models, iMac, iBook and Xserve as well as the Apple Network Server, which was technically not a Macintosh.

== Advertising and marketing ==
Apple positioned the Power Macintosh as a high-end personal computer aimed at businesses and creative professionals with an advertising campaign consisting of several television commercials and print ads. The television commercials used the slogan "The Future Is Better Than You Expected", featuring the first three Power Macintosh computers to showcase special features such as networking and MS-DOS compatibility.

In 1993 and 1994, a television advertising campaign created by BBDO aired with the slogan "It does more, it costs less, it's that simple."

== Timeline ==
Timeline of Power Macintosh models
See also: List of Mac models

== See also ==
- Mac Pro
- PowerBook
- List of Mac models grouped by CPU type
