= Macintosh Performa =

Family of personal computers by Apple Computer, Inc

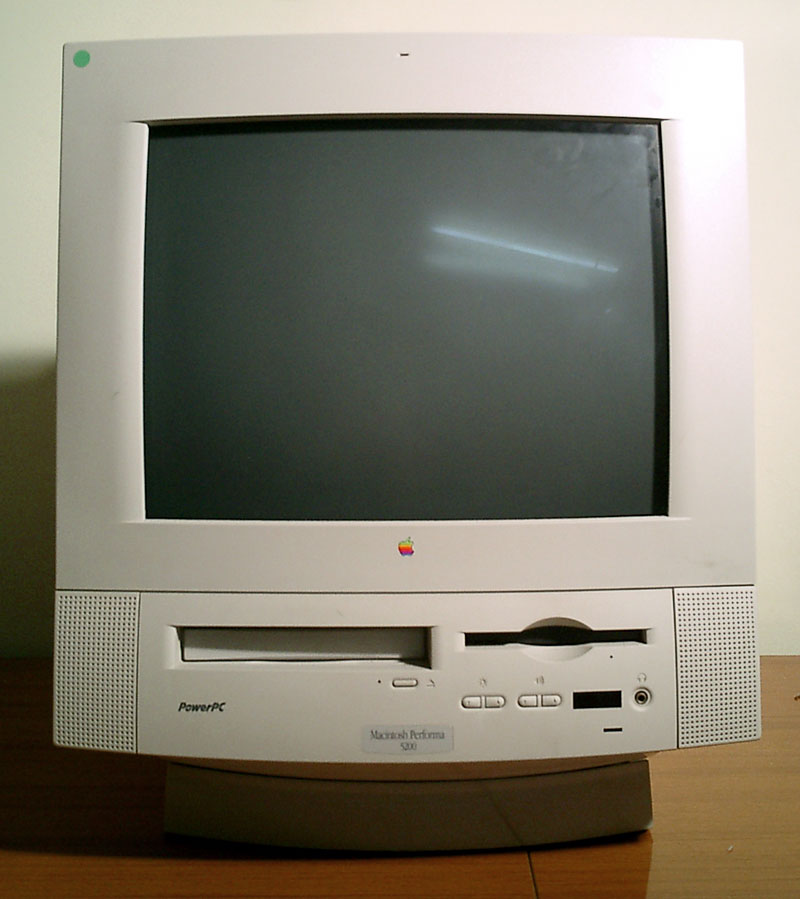
The Macintosh Performa 5200, an all-in-one desktop

The Macintosh Performa is a family of personal computers designed, manufactured and sold by Apple Computer, Inc. from 1992 to 1997. The Performa brand re-used models from Apple's Quadra, Centris, LC, Classic, and Power Macintosh families with model numbers that denoted included software packages or hard drive sizes. Whereas non-Performa Macintosh computers were sold by Apple Authorized Resellers, the Performa was sold through big-box stores and mass-market retailers such as Good Guys, Circuit City, and Sears.

The initial series of models consisted of the Macintosh Classic II-based Performa 200, the LC II-based Performa 400, and the IIvi-based Performa 600. After releasing a total of sixty-four different models, Apple retired the Performa brand in early 1997, shortly after the release of the Power Macintosh 5500, 6500, 8600 and 9600, as well as the return of Steve Jobs to the company. The Performa brand's lifespan coincided with a period of significant financial turmoil at Apple due in part to low sales of Performa machines.

== Overview ==
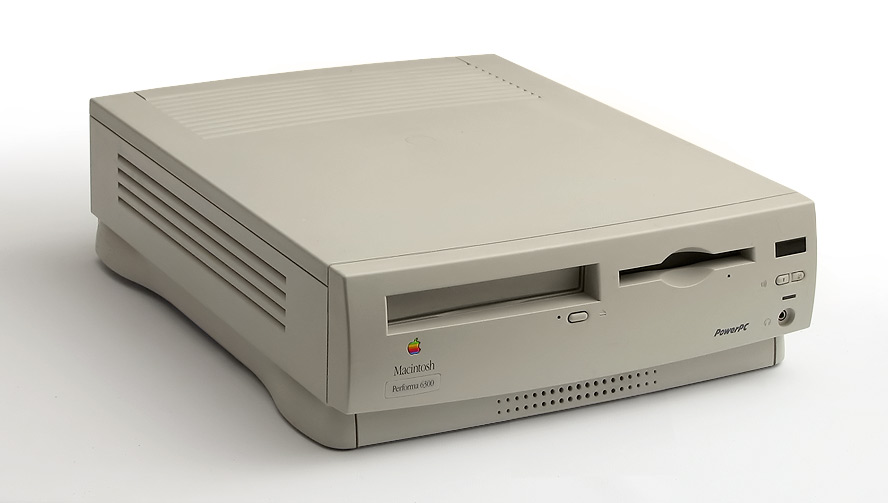
The Macintosh Performa 6300, a desktop-cased model

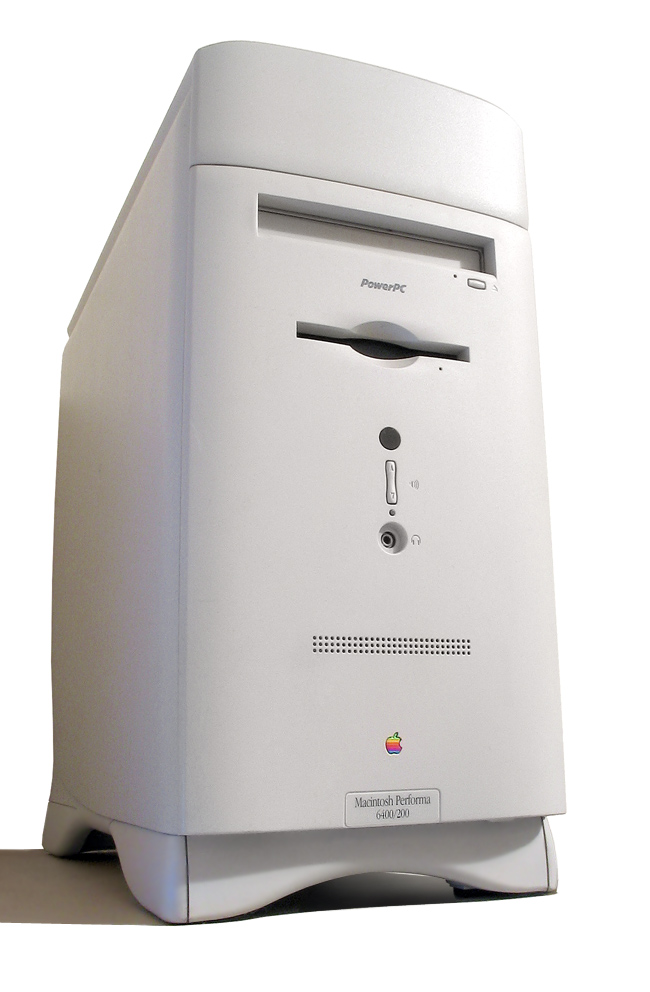
The Macintosh Performa 6400 is one of the few Performas to use a tower case.

With a strong education market share throughout the 1980s, Apple wanted to push its computers into the home, with the idea that a child would experience the same Macintosh computer both in the home and at school, and later grow to use Macintosh computers at work. In the early 1990s, Apple sold computers through a chain of authorized resellers, and through mail order catalogs such as those found in the latter third of MacWorld Magazine. A typical reseller sold Macintosh computers to professionals, who purchased high-level applications and required performance and expansion capabilities. Consumers, however, purchased computers based on the best value, and weren't as concerned about expansion or performance. To reach these customers, Apple wanted to sell their computers through department store chains (such as Sears), but this would conflict with existing authorized reseller agreements, in which a geographic area had only one reseller.

To prevent these conflicts, Apple split the Macintosh line into professional and consumer models. The professional line included the Classic, LC, Centris, Quadra, and Power Macintosh lines, and continued to be sold as-is (i.e., no consumer software bundles or limited features). The consumer line was given the name "Performa", and included computers similar to the professional line. Early Performa models were not sold with the "Macintosh" brand in order to get around the authorized reseller agreements.

The Performa line was marketed differently from the professional line. To satisfy consumer-level budgets, the computers were sold bundled with home and small business applications. Most models were also bundled with a keyboard, mouse, an external modem and either a dot-29 or dot-39 pitch shadow mask CRT monitor. Professional models, in contrast, were sold à la carte with keyboard and mouse bundles chosen by the dealer or sold separately. Monitors sold with high-end Macintosh models typically used Trinitron tubes based on aperture grille technology.

While the Performa models resembled their professional counterpart on the system software and hardware level, certain features were tweaked or removed. The Performa 600, for instance, lacked the level-2 cache of the Macintosh IIvx it was based on.

Unlike the professional Macintosh lines, each individual Performa bundle was given a unique model number, in some cases varying only by the software bundle or the specific retailer that sold that model. This was intended to accommodate retailers, who could advertise that they could beat their competitors' price on equivalent models while at the same time ensuring that they did not actually carry the same models as their competitors. To help consumers choose between the options available to them, Apple created multiple paid advertisements including "The Martinettis Bring Home a Computer", a thirty-minute "storymercial" about a fictional family that purchases a Performa computer that aired in December 1994.

Apple's strategy for selling Performa machines in department and electronics retail stores did not include the sort of specialized training Apple offered to its dealers. This resulted in situations where Performa display models were often poorly taken care of; the demo computers crashed, the self-running demo software not running or the display models not even powered on. Apple tried to address the training issue by hiring their own sales people to aid the store sales staff, most of them recruited from Macintosh user groups. Despite this, however, many returned Performa computers could not be serviced properly because the stores were not authorized Apple service centers.

The problem was compounded by retailers favoring Microsoft Windows, especially after the introduction of Windows 95. Computers running Windows were generally cheaper, and encouraged by manufacturer spiffs, advertising co-ops, and other promotion programs. In addition, many stores preferred to sell their own branded white box PCs, something Apple would not allow.

As a consequence of these issues, Apple overestimated demand for Performa machines in 1995 while also underestimating demand for high-end Power Macintosh models, leading to significant oversupply issues. Introduction of new Performa models slowed as a result: whereas Apple had introduced 20 different Performa models around the world from May to December 1995, the number dropped to four in the first seven months of 1996.

For the late-1996 holiday period, sales of Performa-branded machines had dropped year-over-year by 15 percent, reflective of a company-wide drop in fourth-quarter revenues by one-third compared with 1995.

In February 1997, just days after Steve Jobs returned to the company, Apple refreshed its entire line of desktop computers, retiring a dozen Performa models based on the Power Macintosh 6200 and 6400 with no replacement, and reducing the range of Power Macintosh to six computers (plus a few Apple Workgroup Server variants). The official end of the Performa brand was announced on March 15 as part of sweeping changes at the company that included layoffs of a third of the company's workforce and the cancellation of several software products. By early 1998, Apple's lineup was reduced to four computers: One desktop, one all-in-one, and two minitowers (one of which was sold as a server product). As part of the restructuring of how Apple sold its computers in retail channels, it partnered with CompUSA to implement a "Store within a store" concept. Apple and related products were displayed and sold in a physically separate location by specialized employees (currently done at select Best Buy stores).

== Performa-specific software ==
The Performa versions of the Macintosh System software introduced some features that were not available on non-Performa Macintoshes. The most notable of these are At Ease (parental controls), the Launcher (an application launcher similar to the macOS Dock), and the Performa Control Panel, which included several unique configuration options. The functionality of all three components were eventually folded into the operating system itself. Versions of System 7 with the additional software had a 'P' appended to the end, such as 7.1.2P which was included with the Performa 630 in mid-1994.

Software bundles usually included ClarisWorks, Quicken, a calendar/contact manager such as Touchbase and Datebook Pro, America Online, eWorld, educational software such as The American Heritage Dictionary, The New Grolier Multimedia Encyclopedia, The TIME Almanac (on models equipped with a CD-ROM drive), Mavis Beacon Teaches Typing, or Mario Teaches Typing, and a selection of games such as Spectre Challenger, Diamonds, Lemmings, and Monopoly. Another software package that only the Performa was equipped with was called MegaPhone, a screen-based telephony (SBT) application developed by Cypress Research.

== Timeline ==
Timeline of Macintosh Centris, LC, Performa, and Quadra models, colored by CPU type

See also: List of Mac models

== List of Performa models ==
Blanks indicate missing data. sm According to Apple, all of these models are obsolete. (Note: Apple products that have been discontinued for 7 years and no longer receive hardware support or spare parts)

Source: "Apple Macintosh Performa Specs (Mac Performa Specs): EveryMac.com".

Performa system	Equivalent Macintosh system	Notes	Configuration (standard)							Timetable
Performa system	Equivalent Macintosh system	Notes	CPU	Clock speed	RAM	HD	VRAM	Monitor	CD	Introduced	Discontinued
Performa 200	Classic II	Classic II rebranded when later reintroduced	68030	16 MHz	2 MB	40 MB	N/A	Video Memory built-in CRT	No	September 14, 1992	October 18, 1993
Performa 250	Color Classic	Color Classic sold in UK and Australia	68030	16 MHz	4 MB	40 MB	256 KB	Video Memory built-in CRT	No	February 1, 1993	May 16, 1995
Performa 275	Color Classic II	Color Classic II sold in South Korea and Japan	68030	33 MHz	4 MB	80 MB	256 KB	Video Memory built-in CRT	No	October 1, 1993	November 1, 1995
Performa 400	LC II	LC II consumer variation	68030	16 MHz	4 MB	80 MB	512 KB	No	No	September 14, 1992	October 18, 1993
Performa 405	LC II	Performa 400 with monitor and less VRAM	68030	16 MHz	4 MB	80 MB	256 KB	14″	No	April 12, 1993	November 1, 1993
Performa 410	LC II	Performa 400 with monitor	68030	16 MHz	4 MB	80 MB	512 KB	14″	No	October 18, 1993	November 1, 1993
Performa 430	LC II	Performa 400 with monitor and larger HD	68030	16 MHz	4 MB	120 MB	512 KB	No	No	April 12, 1993	November 1, 1993
Performa 450	LC III	LC III with a larger HD	68030	25 MHz	4 MB	120 MB	512 KB	No	No	April 12, 1993	November 1, 1993
Performa 460	LC III+	LC III+ consumer variant	68030	33 MHz	4 MB	80 MB	512 KB	No	No	October 18, 1993	November 1, 1993
Performa 466	LC III+	Performa 460 with 160 MB HD	68030	33 MHz	4 MB	160 MB	512 KB	No	No	October 18, 1993	November 1, 1993
Performa 467	LC III+	Performa 466 with "business software" bundle	68030	33 MHz	4 MB	160 MB	512 KB	No	No	October 18, 1993	November 1, 1993
Performa 475	LC 475; Quadra 605	LC 475 / Quadra 605 consumer variant with monitor	68LC040	25 MHz	4 MB	160 MB	512 KB	Bundled Apple Color Plus 14″ Display	No	October 18, 1993	April 1, 1996
Performa 476	LC 475; Quadra 605	Performa 475 with larger HD	68LC040	25 MHz	4 MB	230 MB	512 KB	Bundled Apple Color Plus 14″ Display	No	October 18, 1993	April 1, 1996
Performa 520	LC 520	LC 520 consumer variant	68030	25 MHz	4 MB	80-160 MB	512 KB	Integrated 14″ color display	Caddy-loaded CD-ROM	June 28, 1993	February 2, 1994
Performa 550	LC 550	LC 550 consumer variant	68030	33 MHz	5 MB	160 MB	768 KB	Integrated 14″ color display	Bare tray-loading 2x CD-ROM that did not require a caddy	October 18, 1993	March 23, 1995
Performa 560 Money Edition	LC 550	Performa 550 with business software	68030	33 MHz	5 MB	160 MB	768 KB	Integrated 14″ color display	Bare tray-loading 2x CD-ROM that did not require a caddy	January 1, 1994	March 23, 1995
Performa 575	LC 575	LC 575 consumer variant	68LC040	66 MHz	5 MB	250 MB	1 MB	Integrated 14″ color display	Bare tray-loading 2x CD-ROM that did not require a caddy	April 26, 1994	April 1, 1996
Performa 577	LC 575	Performa 575 with larger HD	68LC040	66 MHz	5 MB	320 MB	1 MB	Integrated 14″ color display	Bare tray-loading 2x CD-ROM that did not require a caddy	February 1, 1994	April 1, 1996
Performa 578	LC 575	Performa 575 with more RAM	68LC040	66 MHz	8 MB	320 MB	1 MB	Integrated 14″ color display	Bare tray-loading 2x CD-ROM that did not require a caddy	February 1, 1994	April 1, 1996
Performa 580CD	LC 580	LC 580 sold in Canada, Asia, Australia and New Zealand	68LC040	66 MHz	8 MB	500 MB	1 MB	Integrated 14″ color display	2x CD-ROM	May 1, 1995	May 1, 1996
Performa 588CD	LC 580	Performa 580CD sold in Asia and Europe	68LC040	66 MHz	8 MB	500 MB	1 MB	Integrated 14″ color display	2x CD-ROM	April 13, 1995	May 1, 1996
Performa 600	Macintosh IIvi/Macintosh IIvx	Macintosh IIvi sold in U.S. (unlike Macintosh IIvi)	68030	33 MHz	4 MB	160 MB	512 KB	No	No	September 14, 1992	October 18, 1993
Performa 600CD	Macintosh IIvi/Macintosh IIvx	Performa 600 with CD Drive	68030	33 MHz	4 MB	160 MB	512 KB	No	2x CD-ROM	September 14, 1992	October 18, 1993
Performa 630	LC 630, Quadra 630	LC/Quadra 630 consumer variant	68LC040	33 MHz	4 MB	250 MB	1 MB	No	No	July 1, 1994	July 1, 1995
Performa 630CD	LC 630, Quadra 630	Performa 630 with CD Drive	68LC040	33 MHz	4 MB	250 MB	1 MB	No	2x CD-ROM	July 1, 1994	October 18, 1993
Performa 630CD DOS Compatible	LC 630, Quadra 630	Performa 630CD with a second RAM slot, and a DOS emulation card in the Processor Direct Slot.	68LC040	33 MHz	4 MB	250 MB	1 MB	No	2x CD-ROM	July 18, 1994	July 1, 1995
Performa 631CD	LC 630, Quadra 630	Performa 630CD with second RAM slot, 8 MB RAM standard, 500 MB HD, with monitor and modem	68LC040	33 MHz	8 MB	500 MB	1 MB	15″ Apple color monitor	2x CD-ROM	July 18, 1994	July 1, 1995
Performa 635CD	LC 630, Quadra 630	Performa 630 with 5 MB RAM, 2x CD-ROM, bundled Apple Multiple Scan 15 Display and modem	68LC040	33 MHz	5 MB	250 MB	1 MB	15″ Apple color monitor	2x CD-ROM	July 18, 1994	July 1, 1995
Performa 636	LC 630, Quadra 630	Performa 630 sold to higher-education market.	68LC040	33 MHz	8 MB	500 MB	1 MB	No	None	July 18, 1994	July 1, 1995
Performa 636CD	LC 630, Quadra 630	Performa 636 with CD-ROM sold to higher-education market.	68LC040	33 MHz	8 MB	500 MB	1 MB	No	2x CD-ROM	July 18, 1994	July 1, 1995
Performa 637CD	LC 630, Quadra 630	Performa 636CD with 350 MB HD and a monitor	68LC040	33 MHz	8 MB	350 MB	1 MB	15″ Apple color monitor	2x CD-ROM	July 18, 1994	July 1, 1995
Performa 638CD	LC 630, Quadra 630	Performa 636CD with 350 MB HD and a TV/video in card	68LC040	33 MHz	8 MB	350 MB	1 MB	No	2x CD-ROM	July 18, 1994	July 1, 1995
Performa 640CD DOS Compatible	LC 630 DOS Compatible	Performa 631CD with monitor, modem, and the Performa 630CD DOS Compatible's 486 processor card	68LC040	33 MHz	8 MB	500 MB	1 MB	15″ Apple color monitor	2x CD-ROM	May 14, 1995	February 1, 1996
Performa 5200CD	Power Macintosh 5200 LC	Power Macintosh 5200 LC with 790 MB or 1 GB HD and either 2x or 4x CD-ROM.	PowerPC 603	75 MHz	8 MB	790 MB	1 MB	15″ shadow mask color monitor	2x CD-ROM	May 1, 1995	February 1, 1996
Performa 5200CD	Power Macintosh 5200 LC	Power Macintosh 5200 LC with 790 MB or 1 GB HD and either 2x or 4x CD-ROM.	PowerPC 603	75 MHz	8 MB	1 GB	1 MB	15″ shadow mask color monitor	4x CD-ROM	May 1, 1995	February 1, 1996
Performa 5210CD	Power Macintosh 5200 LC	Power Macintosh 5200 LC sold in Asia and Europe.	PowerPC 603	75 MHz	8 MB	500 MB	1 MB	15″ shadow mask color monitor	4x CD-ROM	May 1, 1995	July 1, 1996
Performa 5215CD	Power Macintosh 5200 LC	Performa 5200CD with a different software bundle.	PowerPC 603	75 MHz	8 MB	1 GB	1 MB	15″ shadow mask color monitor	4x CD-ROM	July 14, 1995	July 1, 1996
Performa 5220CD	Power Macintosh 5200 LC	Performa 5215CD with 500 MB HD, sold in Asia and Europe.	PowerPC 603	75 MHz	8 MB	500 MB	1 MB	15″ shadow mask color monitor	4x CD-ROM	July 14, 1995	July 1, 1996
Performa 5260CD	Power Macintosh 5260	Power Macintosh 5260/100 consumer variant available with smaller 800 MB HD	PowerPC 603e	100 MHz	8 MB, 16 MB	800 MB, 1.2 GB	1 MB	Integrated 14″ shadow mask color monitor	4x CD-ROM	April 22, 1996	February 1, 1997
Performa 5260/120	Power Macintosh 5260	Power Macintosh 5260/120 consumer variant sold in Canada and Australia.	PowerPC 603e	120 MHz	8 MB, 16 MB	1.2 GB	1 MB	Integrated 14″ shadow mask color monitor	8x CD-ROM	October 1, 1996	February 1, 1997
Performa 5270CD	Power Macintosh 5260	Performa 5260CD sold in Europe and Asia	PowerPC 603e	100 MHz	8 MB	1.2 GB	1 MB	Integrated 14″ shadow mask color monitor	4x CD-ROM	April 15, 1996	February 1, 1997
Performa 5280/120	Power Macintosh 5260	Performa 5260/120 sold in Japan.	PowerPC 603e	120 MHz	8 MB, 16 MB	1.2 GB	1 MB	Integrated 14″ shadow mask color monitor	8x CD-ROM	November 12, 1996	June 1, 1997
Performa 5300CD	Power Macintosh 5300 LC	Power Macintosh 5300 LC consumer variant	PowerPC 603e	100 MHz	8 MB, 16 MB	1.2 GB	1 MB	Integrated 15″ shadow mask RGB	4x CD-ROM	October 1, 1995	May 1, 1996
Performa 5300CD DE	Power Macintosh 5300 LC	Performa 5300CD Special "Director's Edition" with additional software.	PowerPC 603e	120 MHz	8 MB, 16 MB	1.2 GB	1 MB	Integrated 15″ shadow mask RGB	4x CD-ROM	October 1, 1995	May 1, 1996
Performa 5320CD	Power Macintosh 5300 LC	Performa 5300CD at 120 MHz sold in Europe and Asia.	PowerPC 603e	120 MHz	8 MB, 16 MB	1.2 GB	1 MB	Integrated 15″ shadow mask RGB	4x CD-ROM	November 1, 1995	August 1, 1996
Performa 5400CD	Power Macintosh 5400	Power Macintosh 5400 consumer variant	PowerPC 603ev	120 MHz	16 MB	1.6 GB	1 MB	Integrated 15″ shadow mask RGB	4x CD-ROM	April 22, 1996	February 1, 1997
Performa 5400/160	Power Macintosh 5400	Performa 5400 sold in Asia and Europe	PowerPC 603ev	160 MHz	16 MB	1.6 GB	1 MB	Integrated 15″ shadow mask RGB	8x CD-ROM	August 1, 1996	December 1, 1997
Performa 5400/180 (DE)	Power Macintosh 5400	Performa 5400 sold in Asia and Europe with black case. The "DE" (Director's Edition) sold in Australia with 24 MB RAM, a built-in TV tuner with remote control, and a larger HD.	PowerPC 603ev	180 MHz	24 MB	2.4 GB	1 MB	Integrated 15″ shadow mask RGB	8x CD-ROM	August 1, 1996	June 1, 1997
Performa 5410CD	Power Macintosh 5400	Performa 5400 without ethernet	PowerPC 603ev	120 MHz	16 MB	1.6 GB	1 MB	Integrated 15″ shadow mask RGB	4x CD-ROM	April 22, 1996	February 1, 1997
Performa 5420CD	Power Macintosh 5400	Performa 5410CD in a black case sold in Europe and Asia	PowerPC 603ev	120 MHz	16 MB	1.6 GB	1 MB	Integrated 15″ shadow mask RGB	4x CD-ROM	April 22, 1996	March 1, 1997
Performa 5430	Power Macintosh 5400	Performa 5400/160 with 24 MB RAM sold in Asia and Europe	PowerPC 603ev	160 MHz	24 MB	1.6 GB	1 MB	Integrated 15″ shadow mask RGB	8x CD-ROM	November 12, 1996	December 1, 1997
Performa 5440	Power Macintosh 5400	Performa 5400/160 with 24 MB RAM sold in Asia and Europe	PowerPC 603ev	180 MHz	24 MB	1.6 GB	1 MB	Integrated 15″ shadow mask RGB	8x CD-ROM	November 12, 1996	September 1, 1997
Performa 6110CD	Power Macintosh 6100/60	Power Macintosh 6100/60 with business software bundle	PowerPC 601	60 MHz	8 MB	250 MB	640 KB	Bundled Apple Multiple Scan 15 Display	2x CD-ROM	November 1, 1994	July 1, 1995
Performa 6112CD	Power Macintosh 6100/60	Power Macintosh 6100/60 with kids' software bundle	PowerPC 601	60 MHz	8 MB	250 MB	640 KB	Bundled Apple Multiple Scan 15 Display	2x CD-ROM	November 1, 1994	July 1, 1995
Performa 6115CD	Power Macintosh 6100/60	Performa 6110CD with larger HD	PowerPC 601	60 MHz	8 MB	350 MB	640 KB	Bundled Apple Multiple Scan 15 Display	2x CD-ROM	November 1, 1994	July 1, 1995
Performa 6116CD	Power Macintosh 6100/60	Performa 6110CD with System 7.5.1 and 350 MB HD	PowerPC 601	60 MHz	8 MB	350 MB	640 KB	Bundled Apple Multiple Scan 15 Display	2x CD-ROM	July 17, 1995	April 1, 1996
Performa 6117CD	Power Macintosh 6100/60	Performa 6115CD with business software bundle	PowerPC 601	60 MHz	8 MB	350 MB	640 KB	Bundled Apple Multiple Scan 15 Display	2x CD-ROM	November 1, 1994	July 1, 1995
Performa 6118CD	Power Macintosh 6100/60	Performa 6110CD with larger HD and both business and kids' software bundles	PowerPC 601	60 MHz	8 MB	500 MB	640 KB	Bundled Apple Multiple Scan 15 Display	2x CD-ROM	November 1, 1994	July 1, 1995
Performa 6200CD	Power Macintosh 6200	Power Macintosh 6200 with 14.4k modem, monitor, and software	PowerPC 603	75 MHz	8 MB	1 GB		Bundled Apple Multiple Scan 15 Display	4x CD-ROM	July 11, 1995	April 1, 1996
Performa 6205CD	Power Macintosh 6200	Performa 6200CD with 28.8k modem	PowerPC 603	75 MHz	8 MB	1 GB		Bundled Apple Multiple Scan 15 Display	4x CD-ROM	August 28, 1995	July 1, 1996
Performa 6210CD	Power Macintosh 6200	Performa 6205CD with a different software bundle.	PowerPC 603	75 MHz	8 MB	1 GB		Bundled Apple Multiple Scan 15 Display	4x CD-ROM	August 28, 1995	July 1, 1996
Performa 6214CD	Power Macintosh 6200	Performa 6200CD with "college student" software bundle.	PowerPC 603	75 MHz	8 MB	1 GB		Bundled Apple Multiple Scan 15 Display	4x CD-ROM	August 28, 1995	July 1, 1996
Performa 6216CD	Power Macintosh 6200	Performa 6200CD without the monitor.	PowerPC 603	75 MHz	8 MB	1 GB		No	4x CD-ROM	July 11, 1995	April 1, 1996
Performa 6218CD	Power Macintosh 6200	Performa 6200CD with more RAM	PowerPC 603	75 MHz	16 MB	1 GB		Bundled Apple Multiple Scan 15 Display	4x CD-ROM	July 11, 1995	April 1, 1996
Performa 6220CD	Power Macintosh 6200	Performa 6218CD without the monitor, but with a TV / video in/out card.	PowerPC 603	75 MHz	16 MB	1 GB		TV card but no monitor	4x CD-ROM	July 11, 1995	April 1, 1996
Performa 6230CD	Power Macintosh 6200	Performa 6220CD with a hardware MPEG decoder card.	PowerPC 603	75 MHz	16 MB	1 GB		TV/MPEG card but no monitor	4x CD-ROM	July 11, 1995	April 1, 1996
Performa 6260CD	Power Macintosh 6200	Performa 6290CD with larger 800 MB HD. Sold in Europe and Asia.	PowerPC 603e	100 MHz	8 MB	800 MB		No	4x CD-ROM	June 19, 1996	December 1, 1996
Performa 6290CD	Power Macintosh 6200	Power Macintosh 6200 with 100 MHz 603e processor and 1.2 GB HD. Sold in North America.	PowerPC 603e	100 MHz	8 MB	1.2 GB		No	4x CD-ROM	January 27, 1996	August 1, 1996
Performa 6300CD	Power Macintosh 6200	Performa 6290CD with more RAM and a monitor. Sold in North America	PowerPC 603e	100 MHz	16 MB	1.2 GB				January 27, 1996	October 1, 1996
Performa 6310CD	Power Macintosh 6200	Performa 6300CD sold in Asia and Europe	PowerPC 603e	100 MHz	16 MB	1.2 GB	1 MB			January 27, 1996	October 1, 1996
Performa 6320CD	Power Macintosh 6200	Performa 6290CD at 120 MHz with monitor and TV/video card	PowerPC 603e	120 MHz	16 MB	1.2 GB	1 MB			April 22, 1996	September 1, 1996
Performa 6360	Power Macintosh 6300/160	Power Macintosh 6300/160 sold in North and South America	PowerPC 603ev	160 MHz	16 MB	1.2 GB				October 17, 1996	October 1, 1997
Performa 6400/180	Power Macintosh 6400	Power Macintosh 6400 at 180 MHz sold in North America	PowerPC 603ev	180 MHz	16 MB	1.6 GB				August 7, 1996	August 1, 1997
Performa 6400/200	Power Macintosh 6400	Performa 6400 at 200 MHz sold in North America	PowerPC 603ev	200 MHz	16 MB	1.6 GB	1 MB	No	8x CD-ROM	August 7, 1996	May 1, 1997
Performa 6400/200 Video Editing Edition	Power Macintosh 6400	Performa 6400/200 with more RAM, Avid Cinema card, and software	PowerPC 603ev	200 MHz	16 MB	1.6 GB				August 7, 1996	August 1, 1997
Performa 6410	Power Macintosh 6400	Performa 6400 sold in Europe and Asia	PowerPC 603ev	180 MHz	16 MB	2.4 GB				November 12, 1996	October 1, 1997
Performa 6420	Power Macintosh 6400	Performa 6400/200 sold in Europe and Asia	PowerPC 603ev	200 MHz	16 MB	2.4 GB				November 12, 1996	August 1, 1997

== See also ==
- List of Mac models grouped by CPU type
- Timeline of Macintosh models
