= Macintosh Color Classic =

Personal computer released by Apple Computer, Inc

Macintosh Color Classic / Color Classic II / Performa 250 / Performa 275
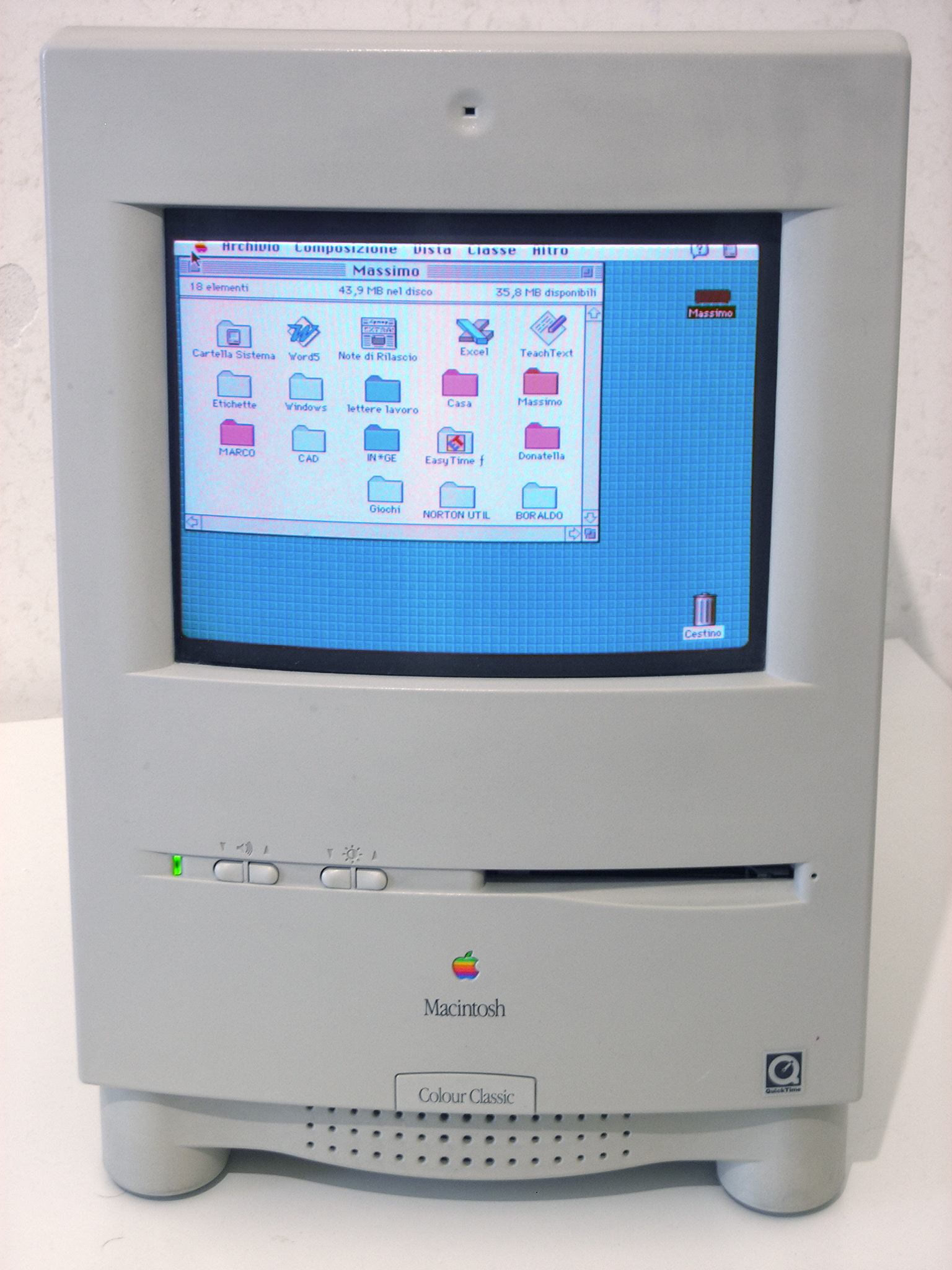
- A Macintosh Colour Classic running an Italian version of System 7
- Developer: Apple Computer, Inc.
- Product family: Compact, Performa
- Type: All-in-one
- Released: February 10, 1993; 33 years ago
- Introductory price: US$1,400 (equivalent to $3,100 in 2025)
- Discontinued: May 16, 1995 (CC II); November 1, 1995 (Performa 275)
- Operating system: System 7.1 – Mac OS 7.6.1
- CPU: Motorola 68030 @ 16 or 33 MHz
- Memory: 4 MB, expandable to 10 MB (100 ns 30-pin SIMM)
- Display: 10-inch, 512 × 384
- Dimensions: Height: 15 inches (38 cm); Width: 10 inches (25 cm); Depth: 12.66 inches (32.2 cm)
- Weight: 10.2 kilograms (22 lb)
- Predecessor: Macintosh Classic II
- Successor: Macintosh LC 500 series Power Macintosh 5200 LC

The Macintosh Color Classic (sold as the Macintosh Colour Classic in PAL regions) is a personal computer designed, manufactured and sold by Apple Computer, Inc. from February 1993 to May 1995 (up to January 1998 in PAL markets). It has an all-in-one design, with a small, integrated 10″ Sony Trinitron display at 512 × 384 pixel resolution. The display is capable of supporting up to thousands of colors with a video memory upgrade.

A slightly updated model, the Color Classic II, featuring the Macintosh LC 550 logic board with a 33 MHz 68030 processor, with the full 32-bit data bus, was released in Japan, Canada and some international markets in 1993, sometimes as the Performa 275.

The Color Classic is the final model of the original "compact" family of Macintosh computers, and was replaced by the larger-display Macintosh LC 500 series and Power Macintosh 5200 LC.

== Hardware ==
The Color Classic has a Motorola 68030 CPU running at 16 MHz and has a logic board similar to the Macintosh LC II, with only a cost-reduced 16-bit data bus.

Like the Macintosh SE and SE/30 before it, the Color Classic has a single expansion slot: an LC-type Processor Direct Slot (PDS), incompatible with the SE slots. This was primarily intended for the Apple IIe Card (the primary reason for the Color Classic's switchable 560 × 384 display, essentially quadruple the IIe's 280 × 192 High-Resolution graphics), which was offered with education models of the LCs. The card allowed the LCs to emulate an Apple IIe. The combination of the low-cost color Macintosh and Apple IIe compatibility was intended to encourage the education market's transition from Apple II models to Macintoshes. Other cards, such as CPU accelerators, Ethernet and video cards were also made available for the Color Classic's Processor Direct Slot.

The Color Classic shipped with the Apple Keyboard known as an Apple Keyboard II (M0487) which featured a soft power switch on the keyboard itself. The mouse supplied was the Apple Mouse known as the Apple Desktop Bus Mouse II (M2706).

A slightly updated model, the Color Classic II, featuring the Macintosh LC 550 logic board with a 33 MHz 68030 processor, with the full 32-bit data bus, was released in Japan, Canada and some international markets in 1993, sometimes as the Performa 275. Both versions of the Color Classic have 256 KB of onboard VRAM, expandable to 512 KB by plugging a 256 KB VRAM SIMM into the onboard 68-pin VRAM slot.

The name "Color Classic" was not printed directly on the front panel, but on a separate plastic insert. This enabled the alternative spelling "Colour Classic" and "Colour Classic II" to be used in appropriate markets.

=== Upgrades ===
Powered by a Motorola 68030 processor, the Color Classic can only go up to Mac OS 7.6.1. However, some Color Classic users upgraded their machines with motherboards from Performa/LC 575 units ("Mystic" upgrade), while others have put entire Performa/LC/Quadra 630 or successor innards into them ("Takky" upgrade). Another common modification to this unit was to change the display to allow 640 × 480 resolution, which was a common requirement for many programs (especially games) to run.

With the Mystic mod, the Color Classic uses the motherboard of the Macintosh LC 575 which has a Motorola 68LC040 CPU (at a speed of 33 MHz instead of 25 MHz) and is pin compatible with the Color Classic. A Color Classic with the Mystic upgrade can go up to Mac OS 8.1 (Mac OS 8.6 and newer require PowerPC processors).

With the Takky mod, the case and connector need to be modded, but doing so will allow the use of a PowerPC 601, 603, or 604 equipped motherboard. A Color Classic with the Takky upgrade can go up to Mac OS 9.1 (Mac OS 9.2 and newer require a G3 processor). On Takky Color Classics, there is a way to upgrade the processor with a G3 CPU, but it will only go up to Mac OS 9.2.2 as Mac OS X isn't officially supported.

== Models ==
=== Macintosh Performa 250 ===
Introduced February 1, 1993 in Japan only.

=== Macintosh Color/Colour Classic ===
Introduced February 10, 1993 in Japan, Asia, and the Americas. Introduced March 16, 1994 in PAL regions.

Also known as the Macintosh Colour Classic.

=== Macintosh Performa 275 ===
Introduced October 1, 1993 in South Korea, and September 9, 1994 in Japan.

=== Macintosh Color Classic II ===
Introduced October 21, 1993 in Japan, Asia, and Canada, and December 3, 1994 in PAL regions.

Also known as the Macintosh Colour Classic II.

== Timelines ==
Timeline of Compact Macintosh models
See also: List of Mac models and Compact Macintosh

Timeline of Macintosh Centris, LC, Performa, and Quadra models, colored by CPU type

See also: List of Mac models
