= Power Macintosh 5260 =

Personal computer by Apple, Inc.

Power Macintosh 5260 / Performa 5260/5270/5280
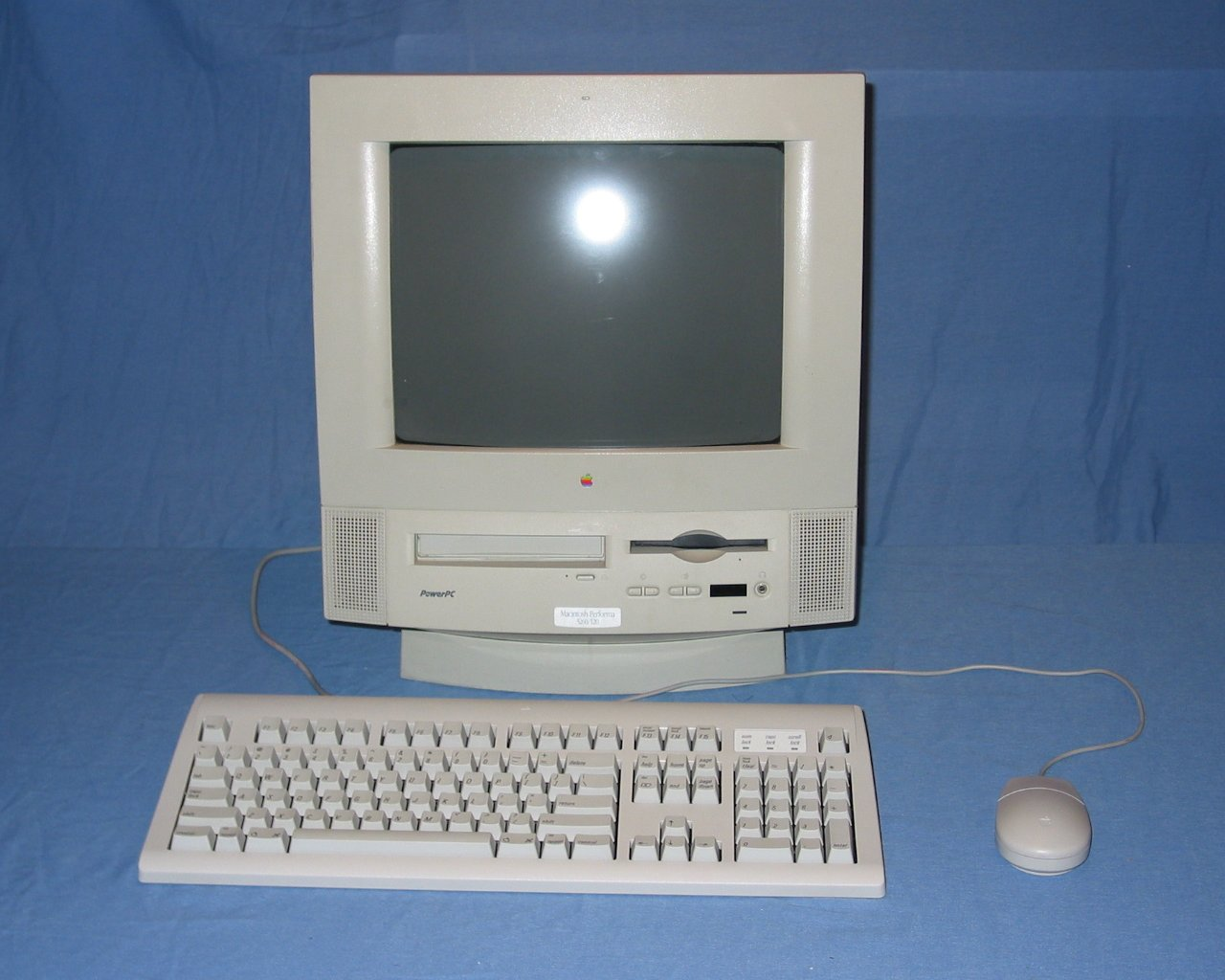
- Front view of a Macintosh Performa 5260/120
- Developer: Apple Computer, Inc.
- Product family: Power Macintosh
- Type: All-in-one
- Released: April 15, 1996
- Discontinued: March 1, 1997
- Operating system: System 7.5.3 - Mac OS 9.1
- CPU: PowerPC 603e, 100 and 120 MHz
- Memory: 16 - 64 MB (72-pin, 80ns SIMMs)
- Dimensions: Height: 17.5 inches (44 cm); Width: 15.1 inches (38 cm); Depth: 16 inches (41 cm)
- Weight: 45 pounds (20 kg)
- Predecessor: Power Macintosh 5200 LC
- Successor: Power Macintosh 5500
- Related: Power Macintosh 5400

The Power Macintosh 5260 is a personal computer designed, manufactured and sold by Apple Computer, Inc. from April 1996 to March 1997. It is a replacement for the Power Macintosh 5200 LC, retaining its all-in-one form factor while replacing its PowerPC 603 CPU with the newer and faster PowerPC 603e, and dropping the "LC" brand. As was standard practice at the time for Apple, the 5260 was re-branded as a number of Performa models and sold to consumer markets, while the 5260 itself was primarily sold to the North American education market as a Power Macintosh.

The Power Macintosh 5400, also an all-in-one model, was introduced at the same time but had a significantly different logic board that retires the Processor Direct Slot in favour of PCI.

The 5260 was discontinued when the Power Macintosh 5500 was introduced in early 1997.

== Hardware ==
The 5260 has an LC-style Processor Direct Slot, and a slot into which an L2 cache card can be added.

== Models ==
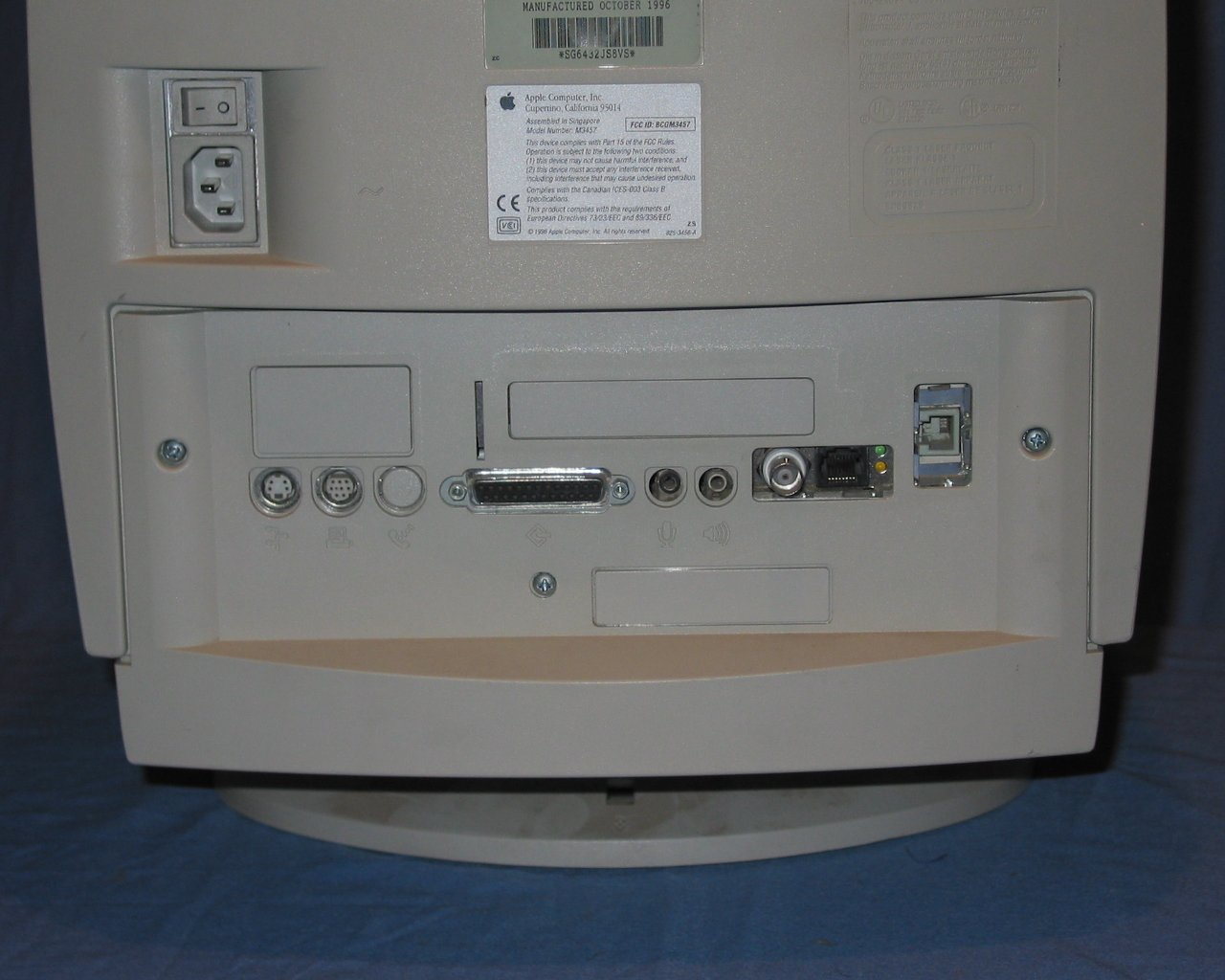
Rear view of the Performa 5260/120

Common to all models are a 14" Shadow Mask RGB display at 640x480 at 16 bit, a single LC PDS slot, 2 RAM slots, and 1 MB of VRAM that cannot be upgraded. There are two serial ports on the back, but they do not support hardware handshaking, precluding the use of an external modem with speeds above 9600 bit/s.

Introduced April 15, 1996:

- Power Macintosh 5260/100: North American education model with 100 MHz CPU, 8 or 16 MiB of RAM, and an 800 MB hard disk
- Macintosh Performa 5260CD: The Power Macintosh 5260/100, also available with the smaller 800 MB hard disk
- Macintosh Performa 5270CD: Identical to the Performa 5260CD, but only sold in Europe and Asia.

Introduced October 1, 1996:

- Power Macintosh 5260/120: Later North American education model with 120 MHz CPU, 16 MiB of RAM and a 1.2 GB hard disk
- Macintosh Performa 5260/120: Consumer version of 5260/120, only sold in Canada and Australia.

Introduced November 12, 1996:

- Macintosh Performa 5280: Consumer version of 5260/120, only sold in Japan.

== Timelines ==
Timeline of Power Macintosh, Pro, and Studio models
See also: List of Mac models

Timeline of Macintosh Centris, LC, Performa, and Quadra models, colored by CPU type

See also: List of Mac models
