= XPostFacto =

Mac OS X boot utility

XPostFacto is an open source utility for Mac OS 9 that enables the installation of PowerPC versions of Mac OS X up to Mac OS X v10.4 (Tiger), and Darwin on some PowerPC-based Apple Macintosh systems that are not officially supported by Apple. It was released in 2002.

== Functions ==
XPostFacto allowed Darwin, OS X, and OS X Server to run on unsupported Mac models. The OS X Installer would not run on machines without a G3, G4, G5, or Intel processor by default, but XPostFacto patched the installer to allow it to run. A Mac OS 9 partition must be booted first. XPostFacto then runs in Mac OS 9 using an installation CD to install a version of OS X.

XPostFacto is available for free, but the company offered support for either $10 or $25.

== Supported models ==
XPostFacto 4.0 works with pre-G3 Macintosh models. Beige box Power Macs as old as upgraded 7300-era machines are supported. Limited support was also available for Performa 6400, 6500 models and Twentieth Anniversary Macintosh with PowerPC G3 upgrade card.

== Reception ==
Engadget questioned the utility of XPostFacto, stating "OS X runs like a limp turtle on our old iMac G3."
