= Spiff (disambiguation) =

A spiff is a small, immediate bonus for a sale.

Spiff, SPIFF, or SPIF may also refer to:

== Organizations ==
- The Spacecraft Planetary Imaging Facility (SPIF) at Cornell University, a NASA Regional Planetary Image Facility

== Technology ==
- Spiff (UNIX), a text comparison tool
- JPEG Still Picture Interchange File Format (SPIFF), an image data format
- SPIFFS, (Serial Peripheral Interface Flash File System), a method for creating a file system in NOR-type flash memory

== Fiction ==
- Spaceman Spiff (Calvin and Hobbes), fantasy identity of title character in the comic strip
- Spiff and Hercules, comic strip (Pif et Hercule in French)

== See also ==
- Spliff
