= Macintosh Classic (disambiguation) =

Macintosh Classic may refer to:

- Macintosh Classic, a Macintosh computer model

- Macintosh Classic II

- Classic Mac OS, Apple's primary operating system for the Mac prior to Mac OS X
- Classic (Mac OS X), a Mac OS X environment that allows Mac OS 9 applications to run in Mac OS X
