= Compact Macintosh =

Original Apple Macintosh personal computer form-factor with a built-in screen

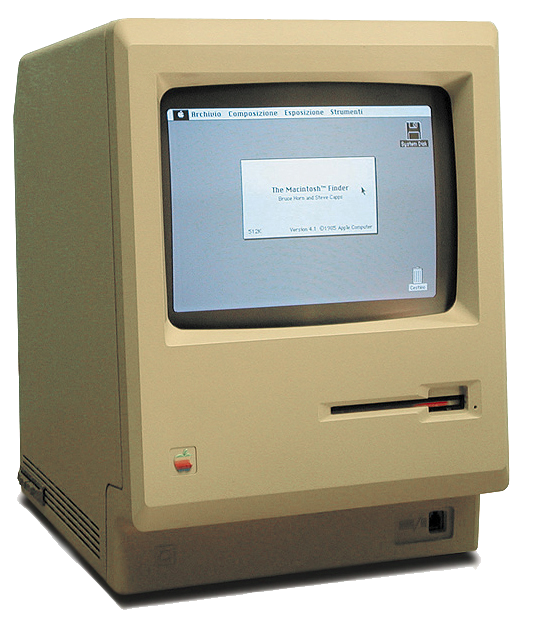
The Macintosh 128K introduced the Compact Macintosh case style. The bevelled edges were also used on the Apple II and the Apple III.

A Compact Macintosh (or Compact Mac) is an all-in-one Apple Mac computer with a display integrated in the computer case, beginning with the original Macintosh 128K first sold in 1984. Compact Macs run through to the Color Classic II sold until 1995.

== Models ==
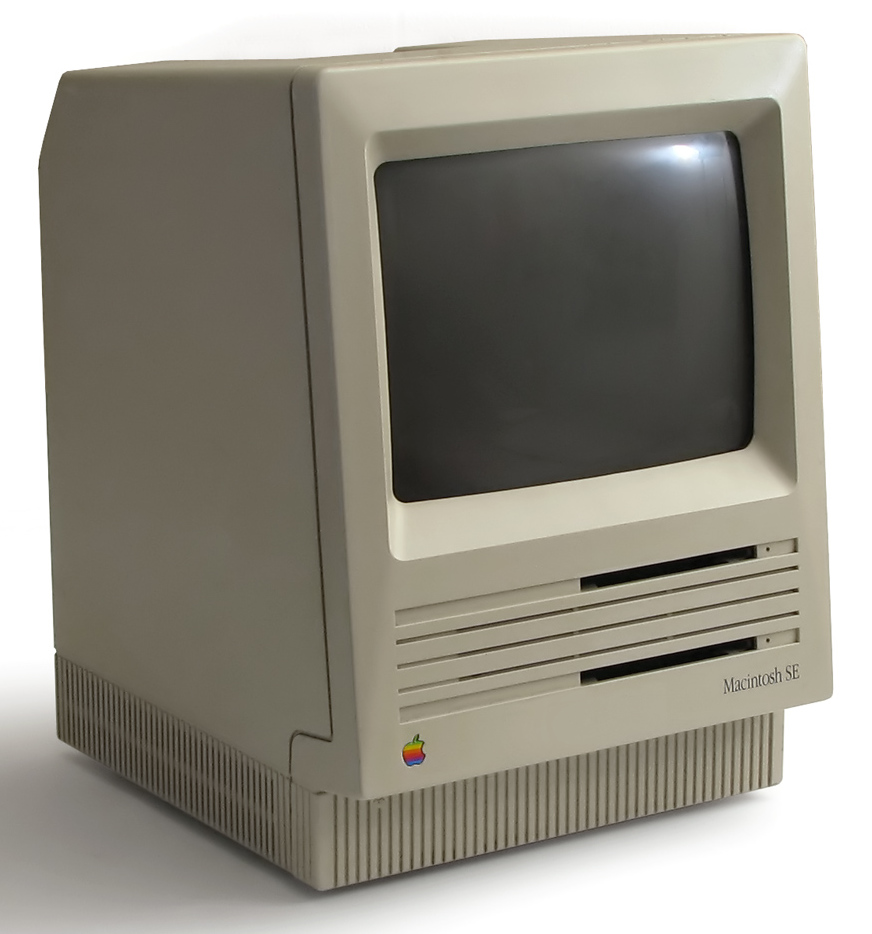
The SE, designed using the Snow White design language

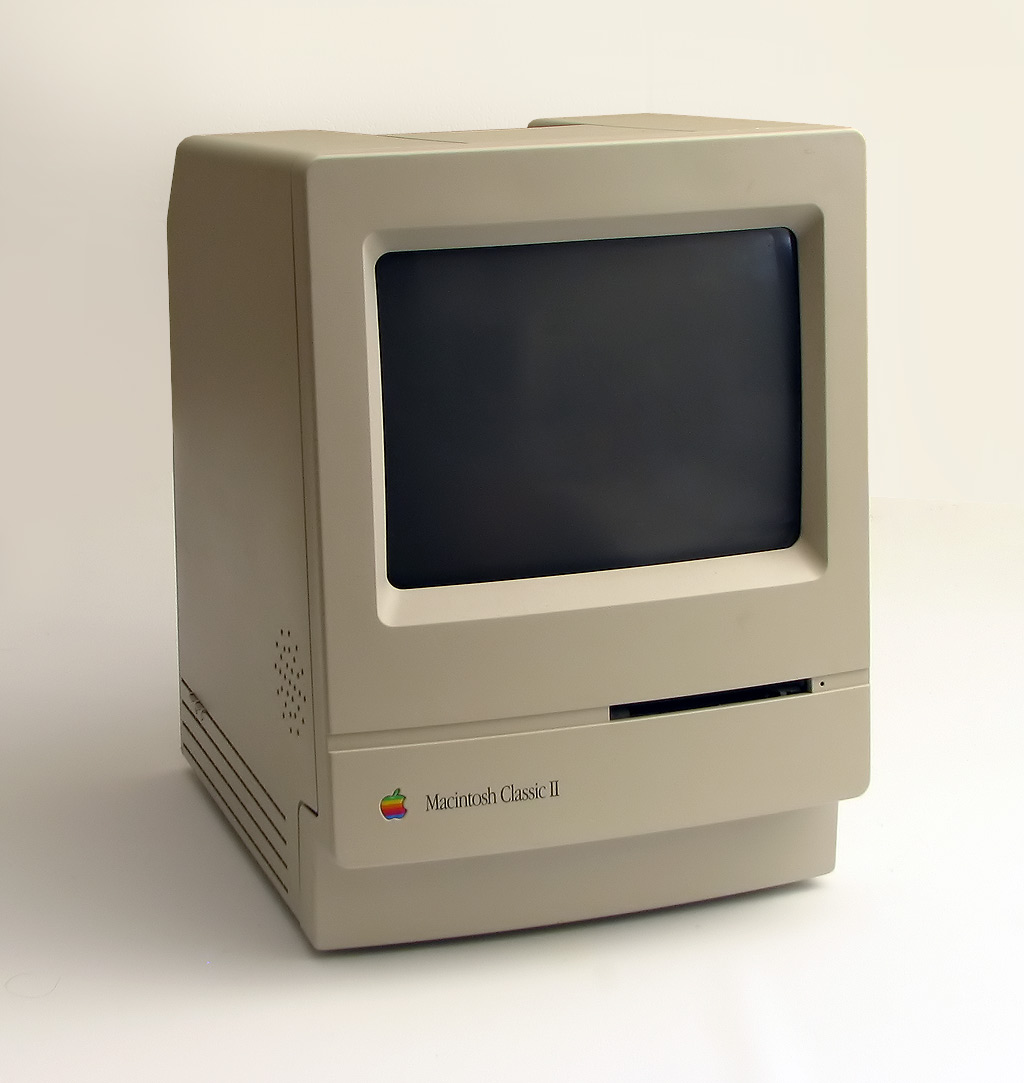
The Classic II, using Apple's early 1990s design style

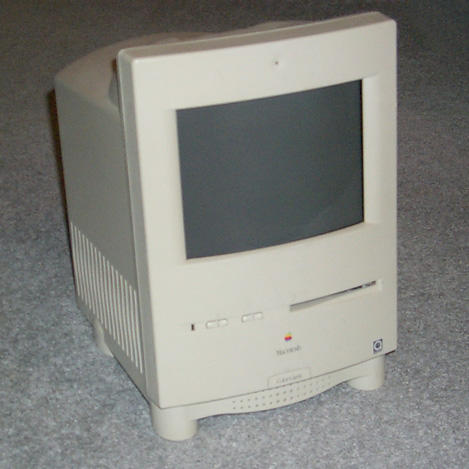
The Color Classic with its modernized "neoclassical" case

Model	Model number	Form factor	CPU	RAM (in KB)	Display
128K	M0001 (Note: 220 V international models are appended with the letter "P" (e.g. M0001P))	Original	68000 @ 7.8336 MHz	128	512 × 342 monochrome
512K	M0001W	Original	68000 @ 7.8336 MHz	512	512 × 342 monochrome
512Ke	M0001E	Original	68000 @ 7.8336 MHz	512	512 × 342 monochrome
Plus	M0001A	Original	68000 @ 7.8336 MHz	1024	512 × 342 monochrome
SE	M5010	SE	68000 @ 7.8336 MHz	1024	512 × 342 monochrome
SE/30	M5119	SE	68030 @ 15.667 MHz	1024	512 × 342 monochrome
Classic	M1420	Classic	68000 @ 7.8336 MHz	1024	512 × 342 monochrome
Classic II	M4150	Classic	68030 @ 16 MHz	2048	512 × 342 monochrome
Color Classic	M1600	Color Classic	68030 @ 16 MHz	4096	512 × 384 color (Note: switchable to 560 × 384)
Color Classic II	M1600	Color Classic	68030 @ 33 MHz	4096	512 × 384 color

== Timeline ==
Timeline of Compact Macintosh models
See also: List of Mac models and Compact Macintosh

== See also ==
- All-in-one desktop computer
