= Power Macintosh 6200 =

Series of personal computers by Apple Computer

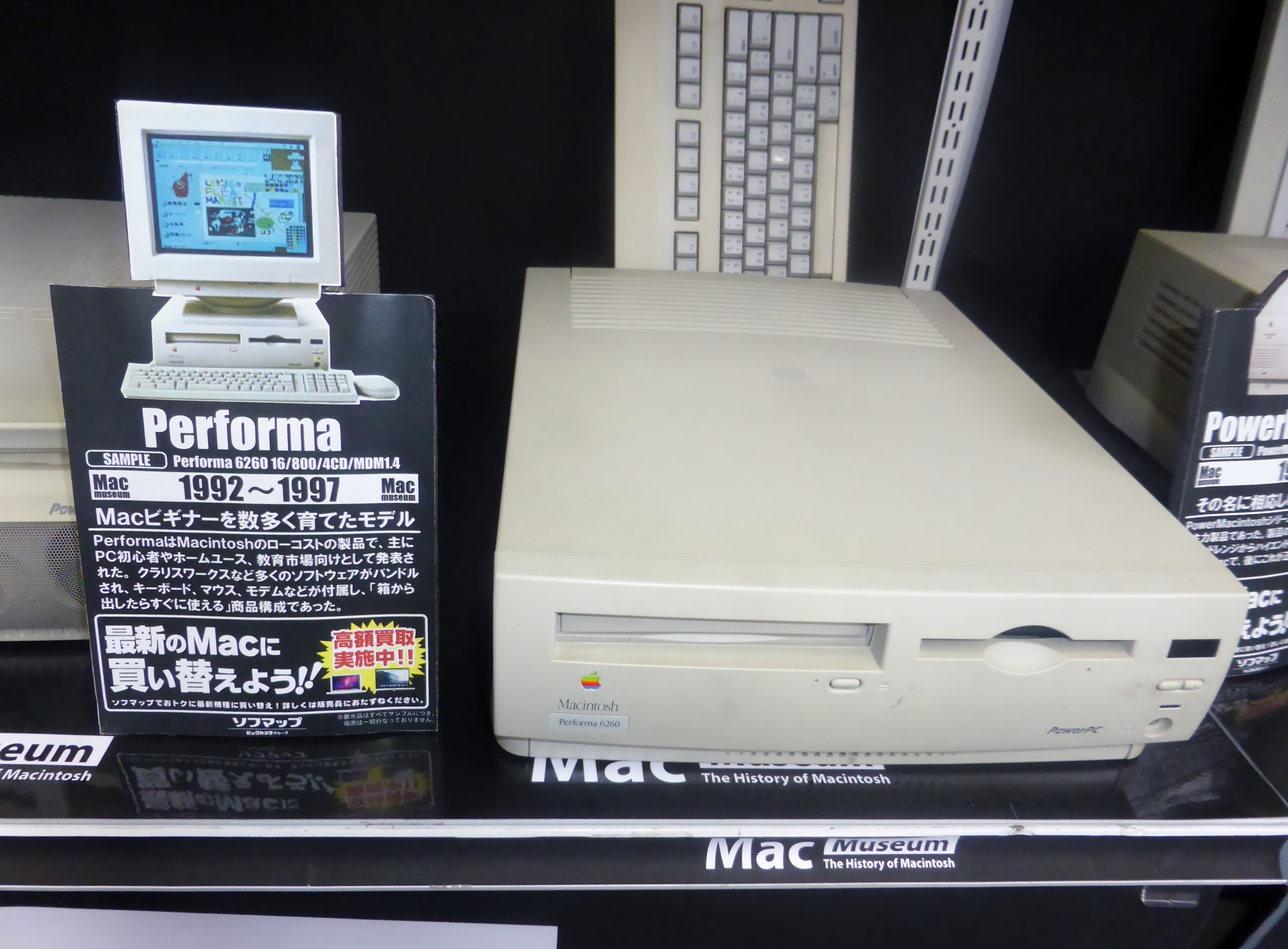
The Macintosh Performa 6260CD, as sold in Japan

The Power Macintosh 6200 (also sold under variations of the name Performa 6200, Performa 6300 and Power Macintosh 6300) is a series of personal computers designed, manufactured, and sold by Apple Computer from May 1995 to July 1997. The 6200 is the PowerPC-based replacement for the Quadra 630, with the same form factor and price range. In early 1997, the rather different Power Macintosh 6300/160 / Performa 6360 based on the Power Macintosh 6400 was introduced. The whole line was discontinued when the desktop model of the Power Macintosh G3 was released.

In addition to the many Performa variants, it also includes model numbers above 6300 (which would normally indicate a different model). The model numbers above 6260 use a PowerPC 603e processor, but are otherwise virtually identical. Finally, some computers with model numbers that indicate they belong to the 6200/6300 family (the above-mentioned Power Macintosh 6300/160 and its Performa version 6360) are rather different on the inside. Generally, the 6200 and 6300 are closely related to the Power Macintosh 5200 LC and 5300 LC. For nearly every 6000-series (desktop) model, there is a 5000-series (all-in-one) model with an integrated CRT screen.

== Power Macintosh 6200 / 6300 ==
Power Macintosh 6200 / 6300
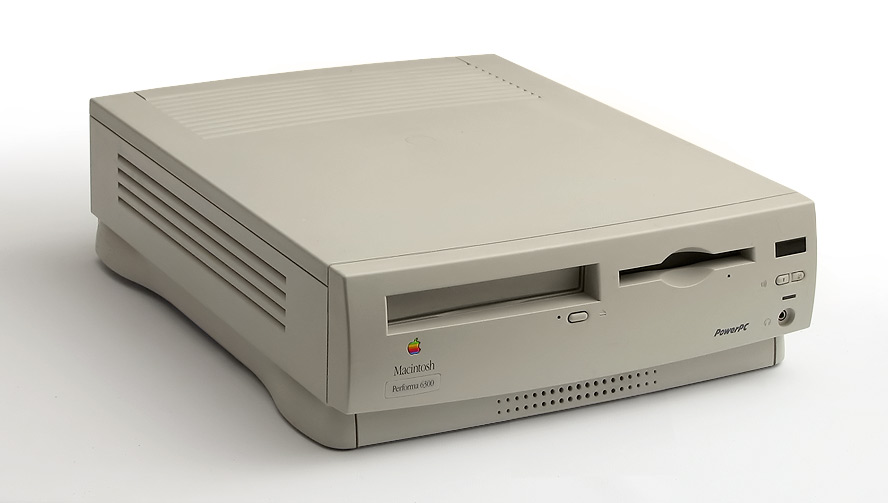
- A Macintosh Performa 6300
- Also known as: "Crusader" / "Elixir"
- Developer: Apple Computer
- Product family: Power Macintosh, Performa
- Type: Desktop
- Released: May 1, 1995
- Discontinued: July 1, 1997
- Operating system: System 7.5.1 to Mac OS 9.1 (except 7.5.2)
- CPU: PowerPC 603 @ 75 MHz; PowerPC 603e @ 100 or 120 MHz

The 6200 shares its logic board with the Power Macintosh 5200 LC. The internal bus structure consists of three buses:

- A 64-bit 75 MHz 603 bus connecting the CPU, 256K L2 cache, and ROM. This is the front-side bus.
- A 32-bit 37.5 MHz 68040 bus connecting the memory, video, and I/O controllers. A custom integrated circuit, Capella, bridged this bus to the 603 bus. Capella is very similar to a northbridge chip.
- A 32-bit 16 MHz I/O bus managed by a custom integrated circuit, PrimeTime II, which is similar to a southbridge (computing) chip.

On January 27, 1996, the 6300 and 6310 models were introduced, with a new 100 MHz PowerPC 603e CPU. On April 22, 1996, the 6320 and 6300/120 were released. These upgraded the CPU speed to 120 MHz. The 6300/120 was sold as a business model in the Asian market. In all cases the front-side bus speed matched the CPU speed, and the 68040 or northbridge bus speed was increased to 40 MHz. The rest of the logic board remained the same.

=== Models ===
Standard equipment on all 6200/6300 models includes an LC-PDS slot, a 1.4 MB SuperDrive with manual insert, two RS-232/422 serial ports, one external SCSI port, one ADB port, monophonic sound input port, internal stereo speakers, and a DB-15 video output port. The internal modem is in a 112-pin expansion slot, allowing for aftermarket modems. There is also an external modem port, but it is covered over by a piece of plastic. If the plastic seal is removed and the internal modem is removed, the external port is usable.

All machines also shipped with an AppleDesign keyboard, ADB Mouse II, and (excepting the 6216CD and 6220CD) an Apple Multiple Scan 15 Display.

Introduced May 1, 1995:

- Power Macintosh 6200/75: The 6200 was only sold in Asia under this name. Includes a 500 MB hard drive. US$2300.
- Performa 6200CD: Basically identical to the Power Macintosh 6200, but comes with a 1 GB hard drive, a 14.4k modem, a bundled monitor and software.

Introduced July 17, 1995:

- Performa 6216CD: The 6200CD without the monitor.
- Performa 6218CD: The 6200CD with 16 MB of RAM instead of 8 MB.
- Performa 6220CD: The 6218CD without the monitor, but with a TV / video in/out card.
- Performa 6230CD: The 6220CD with a hardware MPEG decoder card.

Introduced August 28, 1995:

- Performa 6205CD: The 6200CD with a 28.8k Global Village TelePort modem instead of a 14.4k one.
- Performa 6214CD: The 6200CD with a different software bundle.

Introduced October 12, 1995:

- Performa 6210CD: The 6205CD with a different software bundle.

Introduced October 16, 1995:

- Performa 6300CD: The 6290CD with 16 MB of RAM and a bundled monitor. Sold only in North America.

Introduced January 27, 1996:

- Performa 6290CD: The Power Macintosh 6200 with a 100 MHz 603e processor and one 1.2 GB hard drive. Only sold in North America.

Introduced February 14, 1996:

- Performa 6310CD: Identical to the 6300CD, but only sold in Asia and Europe.

Introduced April 22, 1996:

- Performa 6320CD: The 6290CD with a 120 MHz 603e processor, with a bundled monitor and a TV/video card.

Introduced June 19, 1996:

- Performa 6260CD: The 6290CD with an 800 MB hard drive. Only sold in Europe and Asia.

Introduced June 27, 1996:

- Power Macintosh 6300/120: The 6290CD with a 120 MHz 603e processor and 16 MB of RAM. Sold only in Asia.

== Power Macintosh 6300/160 / Performa 6360 ==
Power Macintosh 6300/160 / Power Macintosh 6360/160 / Macintosh Performa 6360
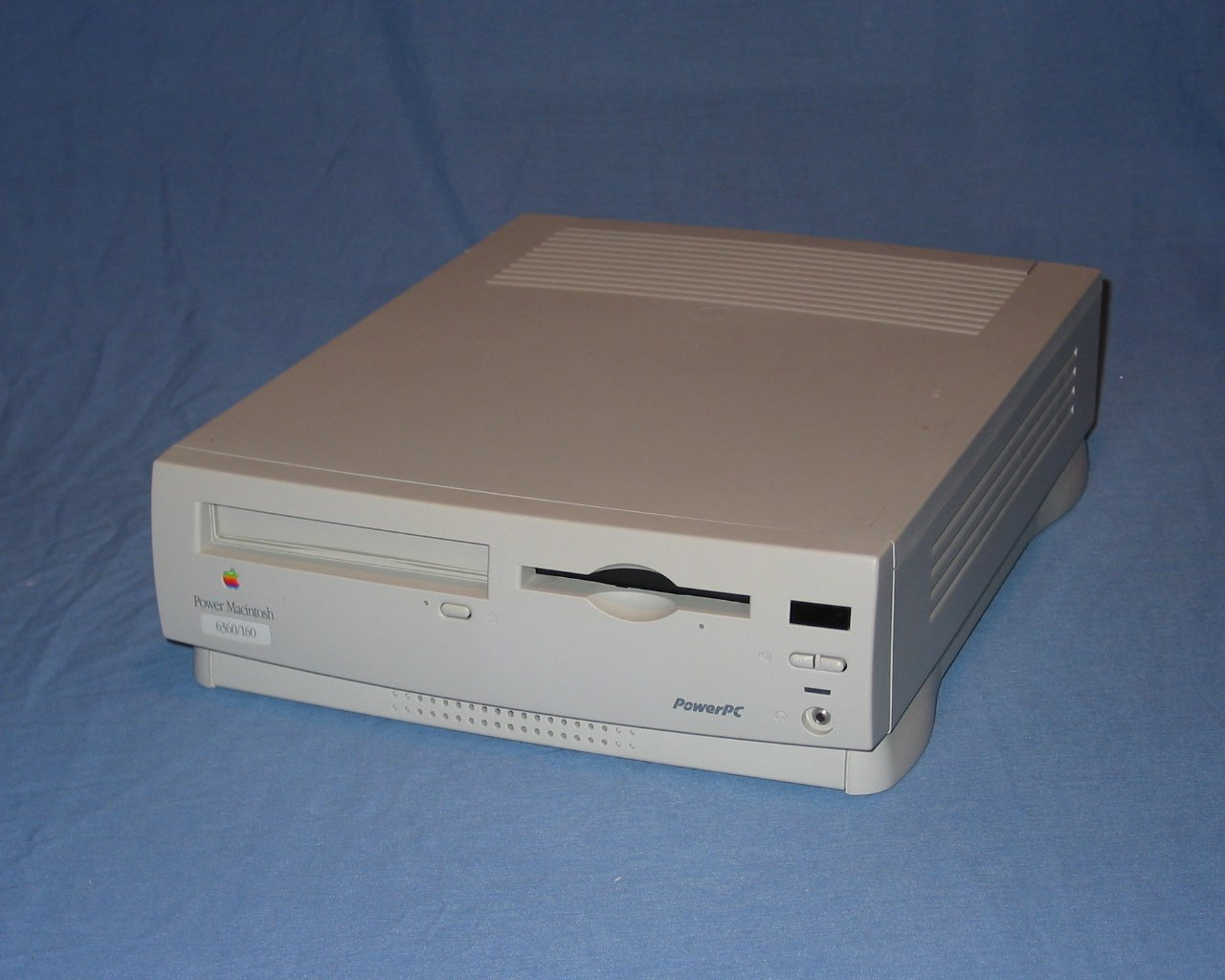
- A Power Macintosh 6360/160
- Developer: Apple Computer
- Product family: Power Macintosh, Performa
- Type: Desktop
- Released: June 27, 1996
- Discontinued: October 1, 1997
- Operating system: System 7.5.3 - Mac OS 9.1
- CPU: PowerPC 603ev @ 160 MHz
- Dimensions: Height: 4.3 inches (11 cm); Width: 12.6 inches (32 cm); Depth: 16.5 inches (42 cm)
- Weight: 17 pounds (7.7 kg)
- Predecessor: Power Macintosh 6100; Macintosh Quadra 630
- Successor: Power Macintosh G3 Desktop

The Power Macintosh 6300/160 (also sold as the Performa 6360) was introduced on October 17, 1996. It retains the desktop form factor introduced with the 6200, but is built around the "Alchemy" motherboard that was first introduced with the Power Macintosh 5400 all-in-one and would later be used in the Power Macintosh 6400 mini-tower. This board has a 64-bit data path and 64-bit DIMM RAM, PCI slot, and Comm Slot II (incompatible with the earlier Comm Slot). It also includes two GeoPort external serial ports. Processor Direct Slot cards are not supported.

Standard equipment on the 6300/160 and 6360 include a 1.2 GB IDE hard drive, an 8X CD-ROM, full stereo input (unlike the 6200/6300 series, which combined stereo input into monophonic sound), one internal speaker (compared to two on the 6200/6300 series), and support for increased display resolutions with higher bit depth, notably 800x600 16-bit color at 60 Hz and 1024x768 8-bit color at 60 or 70 Hz. The 6360's power supply unit is increased to 150 watts.

While the 6360 was designed from the start to support JEDEC-standard 5-volt, 64-bit, 168-pin, EDO 70ns DIMMs with a 2k refresh rate, the logic board did not initially support EDO RAM. A user servicing the machine would need to examine the serial numbers on the on-board RAM to see whether EDO is supported. The 6360 has two DIMM slots, which can be populated by one or two chips of varying sizes up to 64 MB. Combined with the on-board 8 MB RAM, this provides a maximum memory of 136 MB. Because the board only supports linear memory organization, no performance benefit is provided if two chips of the same type are installed. The board also does not support refresh rates beyond 2k.

An optional "High-Performance Module for Power Macintosh 6360" that plugged into an internal cache slot was available from Apple authorized resellers that provide a 256 KB L2 CPU cache. Third-party modules in 256 KB, 512 KB and 1 MB sizes were also sold.

=== Models ===
Introduced June 27, 1996:

- Power Macintosh 6300/160: 160 MHz PowerPC 603ev-based desktop computer. Sold only in Europe and Asia.
- Power Macintosh 6360/160
- Performa 6360: Identical to the Power Macintosh 6300/160. Software package included Adobe PhotoDeluxe, Edmark's Thinkin' Things Collection 2, Broderbund's The Amazing Writing Machine, SurfWatch parental control software, clip-art, and electronic dictionaries. $1,499. Sold only in North and South America.

== Timelines ==
Timeline of Power Macintosh models
See also: List of Mac models

Timeline of Macintosh Centris, LC, Performa, and Quadra models, colored by CPU type

See also: List of Mac models
