= Power Macintosh 5200 LC =

Personal computer released by Apple Computer, Inc.

Power Macintosh 5200 LC / 5300 LC
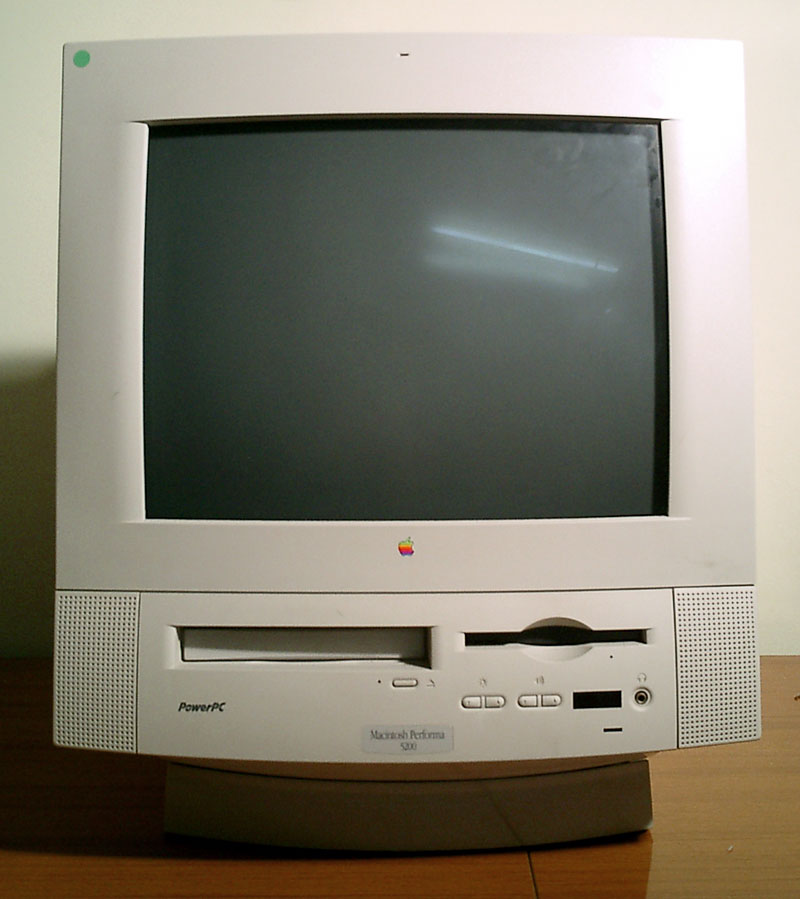
- A Macintosh Performa 5200
- Developer: Apple Computer, Inc.
- Product family: Power Macintosh, Performa, LC
- Type: All-in-one
- Released: April 3, 1995
- Introductory price: US$1,699 (equivalent to $3,590 in 2025)
- Discontinued: March 1, 1997
- Operating system: System 7.5.1 - Mac OS 9.1 (except 7.5.2)
- CPU: 5200 LC: PowerPC 603, 75 MHz; 5300 LC: PowerPC 603e, 100 and 120 MHz
- Dimensions: Height: 17.5 inches (440 mm); Width: 16 inches (410 mm); Depth: 15.1 inches (380 mm)
- Weight: 17 pounds (7.7 kg)
- Predecessor: Macintosh LC 550; Macintosh LC 575; Macintosh Color Classic II
- Successor: Power Macintosh 5260; Power Macintosh 5400

The Power Macintosh 5200 LC and Power Macintosh 5300 LC are a line of personal computers that were a part of Apple Computer's Power Macintosh, LC, and Performa families of Macintosh computers. It was mainly sold in the North American education market. When it was sold to the consumer market, they were marketed as the Performa 5200 and Performa 5300.

The Power Macintosh 5200 LC was introduced in April 1995 with a PowerPC 603 CPU at 75 MHz as a PowerPC-based replacement of the Macintosh LC 500 series. Later models switched to the PowerPC 603e CPU and used model numbers above 5300, but kept the same motherboard design. Unlike previous education models, which prepended the model number with "LC", the 5200 / 5300 models use the Power Macintosh designation of Apple's main workstation line of the time, with "LC" appended to the end.

The 5200 is closely related to the 6200, which uses the same logic boards in desktop cases without integrated monitors.

In an editorial, MacWorld Magazine's Editor-in-Chief, Adrian Mello, wrote of the 5200: "The all-in-one design exhibits a lot of the same spirit that Apple vested in the original Macintosh. A deceptive minimalism belies this machine's utility and value. Apple has again figured out how to package a full-featured computer into the simplest possible shape. [...] Its predecessors, which include the Performa 520, 550, 575 and now 580, all offer good functionality and value, but they lack the 5200's design integrity. In comparison, their efforts to mimic the appearance of a conventional three-piece desktop computer just made them look clumsy."

Production of the 5200 and 5300 models was discontinued in the first half of 1996, with the PowerPC 603e-based Power Macintosh 5260 (with Performa 5260CD and 5270CD variants) and Power Macintosh 5400 (with Performa 5400CD, 5410CD and 5420CD variants) being offered as replacements at different prices. The 5260 retained the overall design of the 5200 and was sold at a similar price with similar features, but shared no parts other than the stand and lower faceplate. The more expensive 5400 was also visually similar but with a significantly different motherboard that offered PCI instead of Processor Direct Slot expansion.

== Hardware ==
The 5200 LC uses a 75 MHz PowerPC 603 CPU. The 5300 LC replaced the CPU with the newer and faster PowerPC 603e, though the rest of the Quadra 630-derived architecture remained unchanged.

The monitor is a 15" shadow mask CRT with a 12.8" viewable size. Supported resolutions are 640x480 @ 60 Hz, 640x480 @ 66.7 Hz, 800x600 @ 60 Hz, 800x600 @ 72 Hz, and 832x624 @ 75 Hz.

The 5200 LC and 5300 LC contains a Processor Direct Slot for expansion, as well as an L2 cache slot for an optional L2 cache card.

=== Problems ===
By March 1996, a number of users were having problems with system freezes and color shifts. The problem was not solvable with a software update, so Apple instituted a program titled the "Repair Extension Program for the Apple Power Macintosh and Performa 5200, 5300, 6200, and 6300." While never formally described as a recall — a distinction Apple emphatically reinforced in its repair documentation — users were required to bring affected units to an authorized Apple reseller for a repair. The program remained in effect for seven years.

During its lifespan, Apple updated the 5200 with a "Revision B" design, replacing the power supply, speakers, analog board, EMI shield, front bezel and rear housing with updated parts that are not interchangeable with those of the original model.

The Performa 5200 line was beset with numerous problems. The 5200's usage of the original PowerPC 603 was also subject to some criticism. Low End Mac called the Performa 5200 series one of the worst Macs of all time.

== Models ==
Introduced April 3, 1995:

- Power Macintosh 5200/75 LC: Sold only to the education market. Features a 500 MB hard drive. US$1,699.

Introduced May 1, 1995:

- Macintosh Performa 5200CD: The Power Macintosh 5200 LC with a 790 MB or 1 GB hard drive.
- Macintosh Performa 5210CD: Identical to the Power Macintosh 5200 LC (with different death chime from Performa 6200 instead of LC one), sold only in Asia and Europe.

Introduced July 17, 1995:

- Macintosh Performa 5215CD: The Performa 5200CD with a different software bundle.
- Macintosh Performa 5220CD: The Performa 5215CD with a 500 MB hard drive, sold only in Asia and Europe.

Introduced August 28, 1995:

- Power Macintosh 5300/100 LC: 16 MB memory standard.

Introduced October 17, 1995:

- Macintosh Performa 5300CD: Consumer version of the Power Macintosh 5300 LC.
- Macintosh Performa 5300CD DE: Special "Director's Edition" of the 5300CD with additional software.
- Macintosh Performa 5320CD: 120 MHz version of the 5300CD, only sold in Europe and Asia.

== Popular use in media ==
- A Power Macintosh 5000 is seen in Dr. Bill Harford's (Tom Cruise) office in Stanley Kubrick's 1999 film Eyes Wide Shut.

== Timelines ==
Timeline of Power Mac, Mac Pro, and Mac Studio models
See also: List of Mac models

Timeline of Macintosh Centris, LC, Performa, and Quadra models, colored by CPU type

See also: List of Mac models
