= Power Macintosh 5500 =

Personal computer by Apple Computer

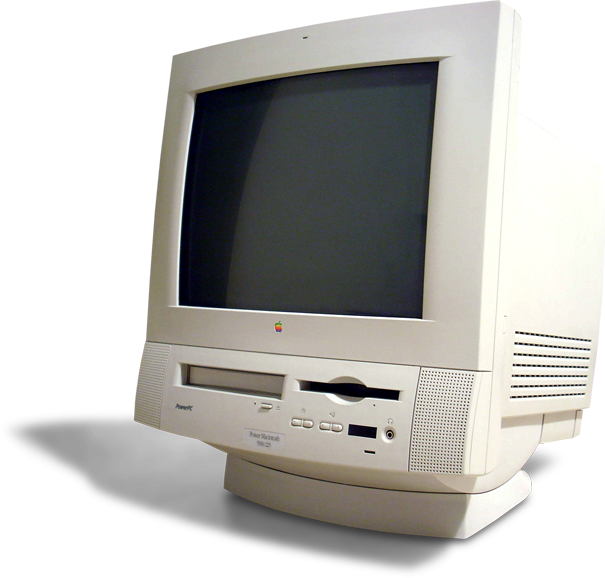
- A Power Macintosh 5500/225
- Also known as: "Phoenix"
- Developer: Apple Computer
- Product family: Power Macintosh
- Type: All-in-one
- Released: February 17, 1997
- Discontinued: March 31, 1998
- Operating system: System 7.5.5 – Mac OS 9.1
- CPU: PowerPC 603ev @ 225, 250 or 275 MHz
- Predecessor: Power Macintosh 5260; Power Macintosh 5400
- Successor: Power Macintosh G3; Twentieth Anniversary Macintosh, iMac G3

The Power Macintosh 5500 is a personal computer designed, manufactured, and sold by Apple Computer from February 1997 to March 1998. Like the Power Macintosh 5260 and 5400 that preceded it, the 5500 is an all-in-one design, built around a PowerPC 603ev processor operating at 225, 250 or 275 MHz.

Apple originally produced the Power Macintosh 5500 for the educational market as a replacement for the previous year's Power Macintosh 5400. It is the last All-In-One from Apple to be housed in the Power Macintosh 5200 LC's form-factor; its replacement, the Power Macintosh G3 All-In-One, introduced a significantly different design.

== Hardware ==
The 225 and 250 MHz models were produced in beige and black, whilst the rarer 275 MHz models were only black.

External ports: External ports include two LocalTalk/GeoPort serial ports, a DB-25 SCSI port, an ADB port, a stereo sound input port, a built-in microphone above the monitor, stereophonic sound output ports, a headphone jack on the front, a stereo miniphone jack on the back.

Memory: Unlike the 5400, the 5500 has no soldered on-board memory. There are two JEDEC-standard DIMM slots (168- pin, 60 ns or faster, 2K refresh rate, 5-volt buffered EDO DIMMs), which can support up to 64 MB each, for a total maximum memory of 128 MB, 8 less than the 5400.

Cache: The processor makes use of 32 kilobytes (KB) of L1 cache, with an option for a 256 or 512 KB L2 cache (the latter being available only on the 275 MHz model) cache operating at the stock 50 MHz bus speed.

Hard disk: The 5500 includes a larger ATA hard disk than its predecessor. The computer came stock with a 2 gigabyte (GB) hard disk, but the 275 MHz model came with a 4 GB drive; a faster SCSI CD-ROM drive (12× in early models and 24× in the top-end).

Video: An accelerated ATI 3D Rage II+ DVD graphics card, containing 2 megabytes (MB) of dedicated SGRAM and allowing for resolutions up to 832×624 at 32 bits per pixel, 1152×870 at 16 bpp, and 1280×1024 at 8 bpp. An optional video connector kit is available which adds a DB-15 output port to the back; the output of this display mirrors the main screen, suitable for presentations.

Floppy disk: The 5500 includes Apple's standard SuperDrive 1.44 MB floppy drive.

CD-ROM: All 5500 configurations include either a 12× or 24× CD-ROM.

Multimedia: 5500s came with optional multimedia expansion cards, that connect via internal cables. In European models, these were an S-Video card and a Philips TV tuner card that also had an audio input. Black 5500s with this configuration were marketed as Director Edition in North America and Australasia and the 225 MHz version had the phrase printed on the case.

Expansion slots: The 5500 has one PCI card slot.

Operating system: The 5500 supports System Software versions 7.5.5 through 9.1 – Mac OS X is not officially supported on this machine. However, it can be run with XPostFacto but is not recommended, due to the 5500's lack of a G3 processor and RAM ceiling of 128 MB. In the general case, 128 MB of RAM is the minimum required for OS X to run (a G3 iMac can run OS X with this amount of RAM), but only on machines with a G3 processor.

== Models ==
While Apple had by this point retired the "Performa" and "LC" brands as a way of distinguishing different build configurations, they still built different configurations for different markets.

- Power Macintosh 5500/225: 16 MB DRAM, 2 GB HDD, 12× CD-ROM. Sold worldwide.
  - Additional configuration for education customers: 32 MB DRAM, 24× CD-ROM, Ethernet
  - Additional configuration for Japan: 32 MB DRAM, 4 GB HDD, 33.6k modem, 24× CD-ROM, Ethernet
  - Additional configuration for Europe: 32 MB DRAM, 2 GB HDD, 33.6k modem, 24× CD-ROM, Ethernet
- Power Macintosh ONE/225: Same as the 5500/225, sold in the UK education market, through an agreement with a UK-based company called Xemplar. Aside from some original Macintosh units, this is possibly the only Apple-manufactured Macintosh to be sold with another company's logo on the front.
- Power Macintosh 5500/250: Same as the 5500/225 but with a 250 MHz CPU, sold in Japan and Australia.
  - Additional configuration for Japan and Australia: 32 MB DRAM, 4 GB HDD, 24× CD-ROM, Video in, 33.6k modem
  - Additional configuration for U.S. education customers: 32 MB DRAM, 24× CD-ROM, Video in, NTSC out, Ethernet
  - In Australia, a black Directors Edition was sold.
- Power Macintosh 5500/275: Same as the 5500/225 but with a 275 MHz CPU, sold in Europe.
  - Additional configuration sold: Graphite-colored exterior plastic parts, 32 MB DRAM, 4 GB HDD, 24× CD-ROM, TV/FM tuner, Video in, 33.6k modem

== Timeline ==
Timeline of Power Macintosh models
See also: List of Mac models
