= Macintosh LC II =

Personal computer by Apple, Inc.

Macintosh LC II Performa 400/405/410/430
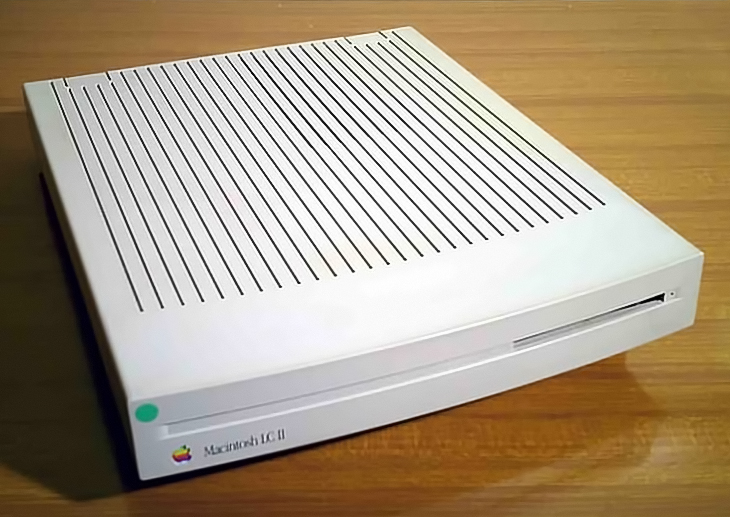
- Macintosh LC II
- Developer: Apple Computer
- Product family: LC, Performa
- Released: March 23, 1992
- Introductory price: US$1,699 (equivalent to $3,900 in 2025)
- Discontinued: March 15, 1993
- Operating system: System 6.0.8L/7.0.1 – Mac OS 7.6.1
- CPU: Motorola 68030 @ 15.66 MHz
- Memory: 4 MB, expandable to 10 MB (30-pin SIMM)
- Dimensions: 2.9 × 12.2 × 15.3 in (74 × 310 × 389 mm)
- Weight: 8.8 lb (4.0 kg)
- Predecessor: Macintosh LC
- Successor: Macintosh LC III

The Macintosh LC II is a personal computer designed, manufactured, and sold by Apple Computer from March 1992 to March 1993. The LC II succeeded the LC, which would be discontinued, replacing its Motorola 68020 processor with a 68030 and increasing the onboard memory to 4 MB. The LC II was priced at US$1,699 (equivalent to $3,900 in 2025), a reduction of US$800 (equivalent to $1,840 in 2025) compared to the original LC when it was introduced.

In September 1992, Apple introduced the Macintosh Performa family of consumer-oriented computers. The LC II was repackaged as the Performa 400. When LC II was succeeded by the Macintosh LC III in early 1993, the LC II continued to be sold in some markets for some time after that. In North America, although the use of the LC II branding ceased, two new Performa models (the 405 and 430) were introduced in its place. In October, the Performa 400, 405, and 430 were all discontinued and a new LC II-based model called the Performa 410 was introduced that became Apple's new entry-level computer.

The LC II was Apple's highest-selling Macintosh product in 1992.

== Overview ==
The LC II retains the original LC's 16-bit system bus and 10 MB RAM limit, making its performance roughly the same as the earlier model; speed tests often found that the LC II was often slightly slower. The main benefit of the 68030 processor in the LC II is its onboard paged memory management unit, which System 7 uses to enable its new virtual memory feature. Apple had opted to get a quick update to the LC out the door instead of spending the additional time required to do a full architectural update, which would happen the following year with the Macintosh LC III.

The LC II was sold at the same time as the Macintosh IIsi, which was more than $800 more expensive than the LC II, but did not have its 10 MB memory limit, 16-bit data bus, and mono audio output. The IIsi also includes a NuBus expansion slot that the LC II lacks, and can be powered on via the power button on Mac keyboards of the era, unlike the LC range, which had a power switch on the back of the unit and did nothing in response to the keyboard's power button.

== Hardware ==
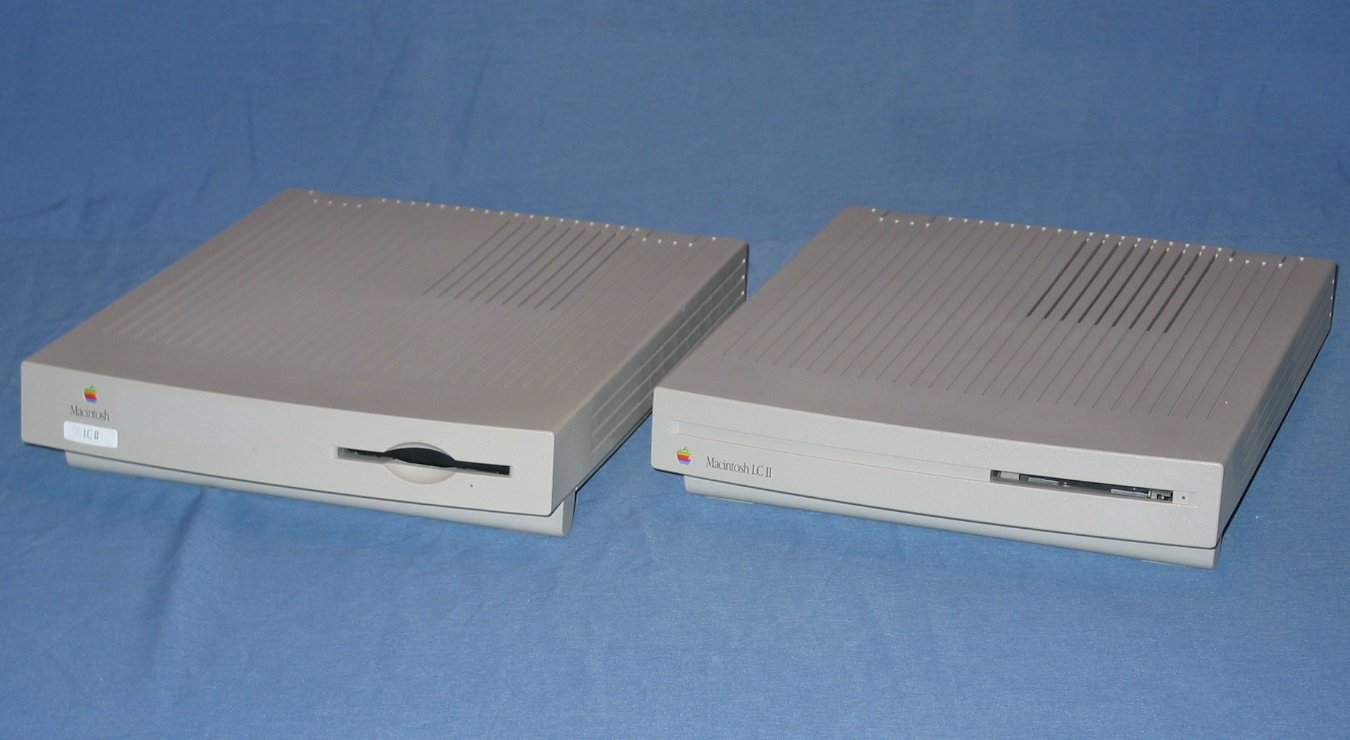
Front view of the manual-eject (left) and auto-eject (right) bezels of two LC IIs, the older right bezel featured the horizontal indentation aligning with the floppy drive, which was a defining characteristic of the Snow White design language.

Case: The LC II retains its predecessor's pizza box form factor. The design was updated during the LC II's production run when the auto-eject floppy drive was substituted for a manual-eject unit, while the revised front bezel no longer featured the horizontal indentation aligning with the floppy drive, a defining characteristic of the Snow White design language.

Logic board: The LC II retains much of the original LC's logic board design, including a 16-bit data path and a 10 MB memory limit. These limitations limited the machine's ability to take full advantage of the 68030 CPU.

Storage: The LC II shipped with one floppy drive as standard, with options for 40 or 80 MB hard drives. While the original LC had two internal floppy drive connectors, the LC II has one. About 5% of the LC units sold had two floppy drives, and internal hard disks were becoming common by 1992, so the second connector was removed.

Video: The LC II's logic board has one video RAM slot, which is filled with a 256 kB SIMM as standard; the high-end configurations were shipped with a 512 kB SIMM instead. VRAM SIMMs can be upgraded and the ones from the original LC are supported in the LC II.

An LC II (or LC) with 256 kB of video RAM (VRAM), supports a display resolution of 512 × 384 pixels (px) at 8-bit color or 640 × 480 px at 4 bits. With 512 kB it supports a display resolution of 512 × 384 px at 16 bits or 640 × 480 px at 8 bits.

Upgrades: Apple sold a $599 upgrade kit that replaced the LC II's logic board with that of the LC III.

== Models ==
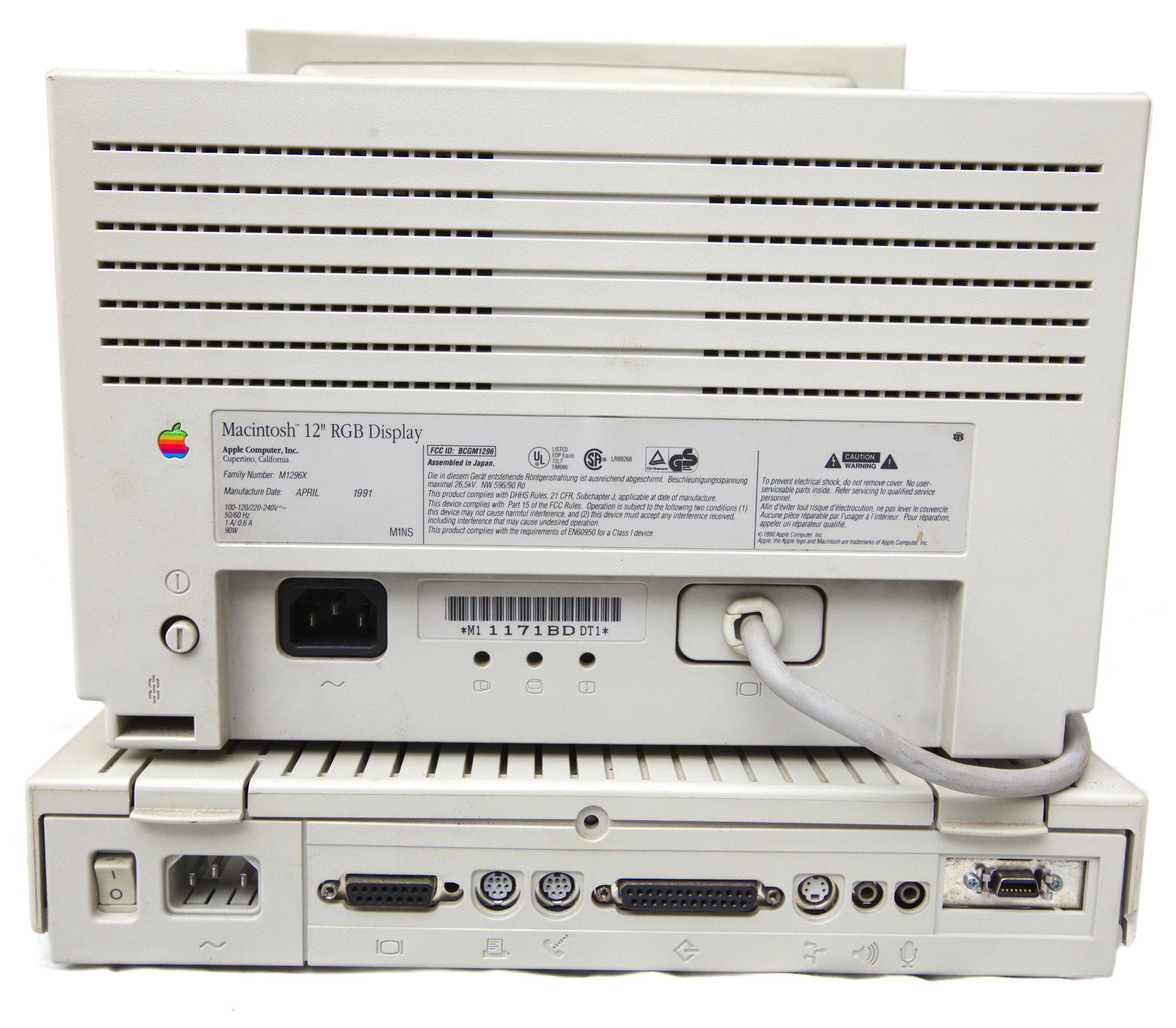
Rear view of a Macintosh LC II, paired with a 12" RGB display

Introduced March 23, 1992 (and discontinued March 15, 1993):

- Macintosh LC II: Sold in these configurations:
  - 4 MB RAM, 40 MB HDD. US$1,699.
  - 4 MB RAM, 80 MB HDD, 256 KB VRAM. US$1,849.
  - 4 MB RAM, 80 MB HDD, 512 KB VRAM. US$2,049.

Introduced September 14, 1992:

- Performa 400: 4 MB RAM, 512 KB VRAM, 80 MB HDD.

Introduced April 12, 1993:

- Performa 405: 4 MB RAM, 256 KB VRAM, 80 MB HDD.
- Performa 430: 4 MB RAM, 256 KB VRAM, 120 MB HDD.

Introduced October 18, 1993:

- Performa 410: 4 MB RAM, 512 KB VRAM, 80 MB HDD.

== Technical specifications ==
According to Apple, all of these models are obsolete. (Note: Apple products that have been discontinued for 7 years and no longer receive hardware support or spare parts)

Model		Macintosh LC II					Macintosh Performa 400	Macintosh Performa 405	Macintosh Performa 430	Macintosh Performa 410
Timetable	Released	March 23, 1992					September 14, 1992	April 12, 1993	October 18, 1993	
Timetable	Discontinued	March 15, 1993					October 18, 1993	November 1, 1993		
Model	Model number	M1700								
Model	Order number	M1701	M1723	M1707	M1387	M1720 (Ed only)	M1885	M1719	M1721	M1985
Performance	Processor	68030								
Performance	Clock speed and bus	16 MHz								
Performance	Cache	0.5kB L1								
Performance	Memory	4 MB								
Performance	Memory	30-pin 100 ns SIMM								
Performance	Memory	Expandable to 10 MB								
Performance	Graphics	256 kB VRAM SIMM		512 kB VRAM SIMM		256 kB VRAM SIMM	512 kB VRAM SIMM	256 kB VRAM SIMM		512 kB VRAM SIMM
Performance	Graphics	Expandable to 512 kB		Not expandable		Expandable to 512 kB	Not expandable	Expandable to 512 kB		Not expandable
Storage	Floppy drive	Floppy drive								
Storage	Hard drive	40 MB		80 MB	160 MB	None	80 MB		120 MB	80 MB
Storage	Optical drive	None								
Connectivity		1 LC PDS								
Dimensions	Weight	8.8 pounds (4.0 kg)								
Dimensions	Volume	2.9 inches (7.4 cm) × 12.2 inches (31 cm) × 15.3 inches (39 cm)								
Operating system	Minimum	System 7.0.1	System 6.0.8	System 7.0.1			System 7.0P			
Operating system	Latest release	System 7.6.1								

== Timeline ==
Timeline of Macintosh Centris, LC, Performa, and Quadra models, colored by CPU type

See also: List of Mac models
