= Macintosh Classic II =

Personal computer by Apple

Macintosh Classic II / Performa 200
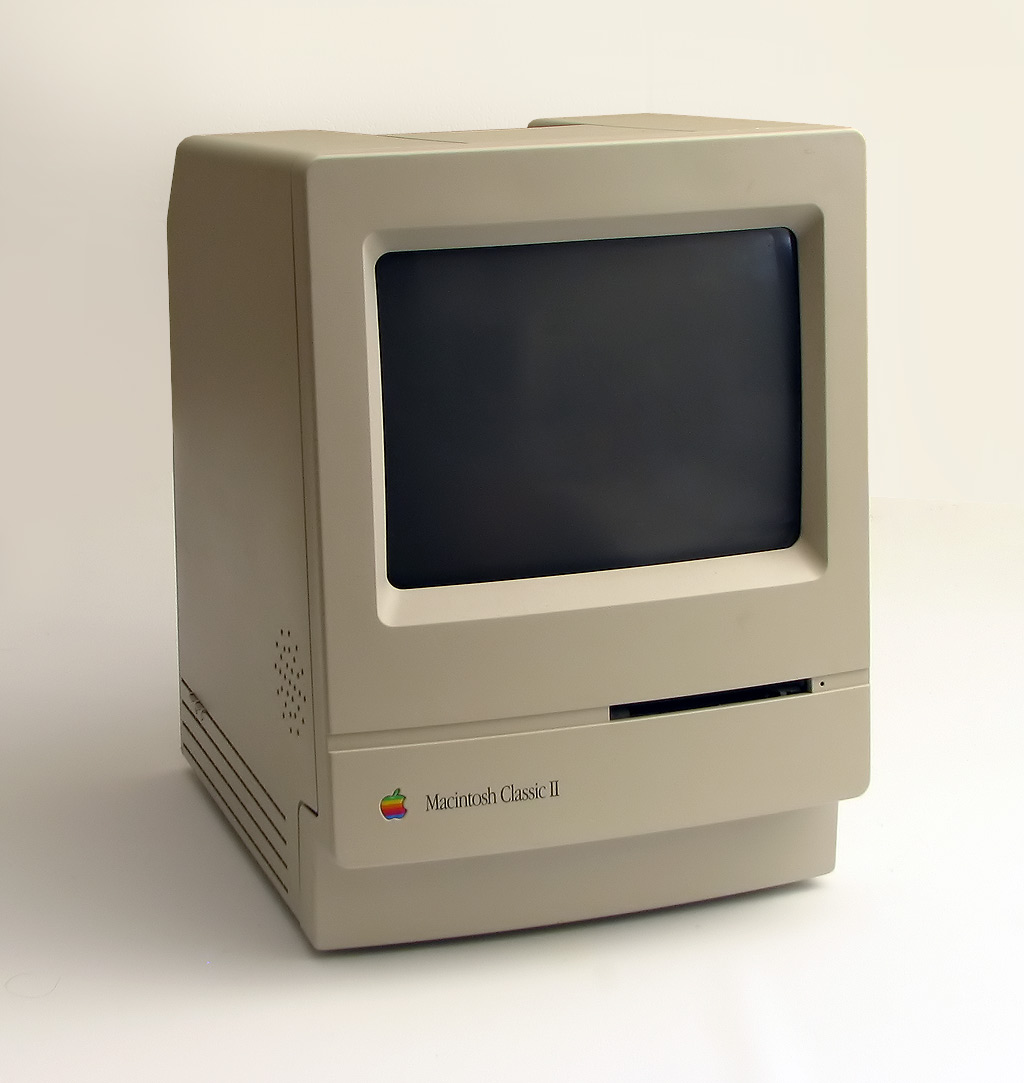
- Codename: Apollo
- Developer: Apple Computer, Inc.
- Product family: Compact Macintosh
- Released: October 21, 1991
- Introductory price: US$1,900 (equivalent to $4,490 in 2025)
- Discontinued: October 18, 1993
- Operating system: System 6.0.8L – Mac OS 7.6.1
- CPU: Motorola 68030 @ 16 MHz
- Memory: 2 MB, expandable to 10 MB (100 ns 30-pin SIMM)
- Removable storage: 3 1/2-inch 1.44 MB SuperDrive floppy disk
- Display: 9-inch (23 cm) monochrome, 512 × 342
- Dimensions: Height: 13.2 in (34 cm); Width: 9.7 in (25 cm); Depth: 11.2 in (28 cm)
- Weight: 16 lb (7.3 kg)
- Predecessor: Macintosh Classic
- Successor: Macintosh Color Classic

The Macintosh Classic II (also sold as the Performa 200) is a personal computer designed and manufactured by Apple Computer, Inc. from October 1991 to September 1993. It updated the original Macintosh Classic with a faster processor, greater memory capacity, and an audio input jack. Apple positioned it as a higher-performance version of the Classic rather than a lower-cost alternative to the Macintosh SE/30. It was priced above the Classic and below the Macintosh LC.

The Classic II retained the compact design of earlier Compact Macintosh models, with an integrated 9-inch monochrome display and a molded carrying handle. Like the SE/30, it used a 16 MHz Motorola 68030 processor, but its 16-bit data bus made it about 30% slower than the SE/30, which had a 32-bit bus. It also lacked a floating-point unit (FPU). The computer came with 2 MB of memory, expandable to 10 MB, and was sold with either a 40 MB or an 80 MB hard disk drive.

Although styled after the original Classic, the Classic II shared more of its architecture with the Macintosh LC. It used custom application-specific integrated circuits (ASICs) also found in the LC, reducing the number of components and manufacturing costs. The computer lacked an internal Processor Direct Slot, but included a connector for third-party cards that added an FPU or new ROM.

The Classic II was one of three computers introduced under Apple's Macintosh Performa brand in September 1992, which targeted the home market. Sold as the Performa 200, it had the same specifications as the Classic II but was often bundled with additional software. Packages varied by retailer and commonly included At Ease, an alternative desktop environment designed to provide a simpler interface than the standard Finder.

The Classic II was the last black-and-white compact Macintosh and the last desktop Macintosh to include an external floppy disk drive port. Apple discontinued support for the Classic II on January 1, 2001.

== Development ==
Following demand for the Macintosh Classic, Apple developed the Classic II to address criticism of the earlier model's performance and memory capacity. Development began in November 1990, with plans for a faster processor, additional memory to better support System 7, and an audio input jack.

Production began in Singapore in July 1991. By the time the computer was unveiled at COMDEX that year, Apple had produced 100,000 units, seeking to avoid the supply shortages that had affected the original Classic.

The Classic II used a 16 MHz Motorola 68030 processor, but its 16-bit data bus made it about 30% slower than the Macintosh SE/30, which had a 32-bit bus. It lacked a floating-point unit (FPU). The computer came with 2 MB of memory, expandable to 10 MB, and was available with either a 40 MB or an 80 MB hard disk drive.

Apple offered an upgrade from the Macintosh Classic to the Classic II for US$699 (equivalent to $1,652 in 2025).

== Models ==
- Macintosh Classic II: Sold in two configurations:
  - 2/40: 2 MB RAM, 40 MB HDD. US$1,899 (equivalent to $4,489 in 2025). Released October 1991.
  - 4/80: 4 MB RAM, 80 MB HDD. US$2,399 (equivalent to $5,671 in 2025). Released October 1991.
- Macintosh Performa 200:
  - 2 MB RAM, 40 MB HDD. US$900 (equivalent to $2,065 in 2025). Released September 1992.

== Hardware ==
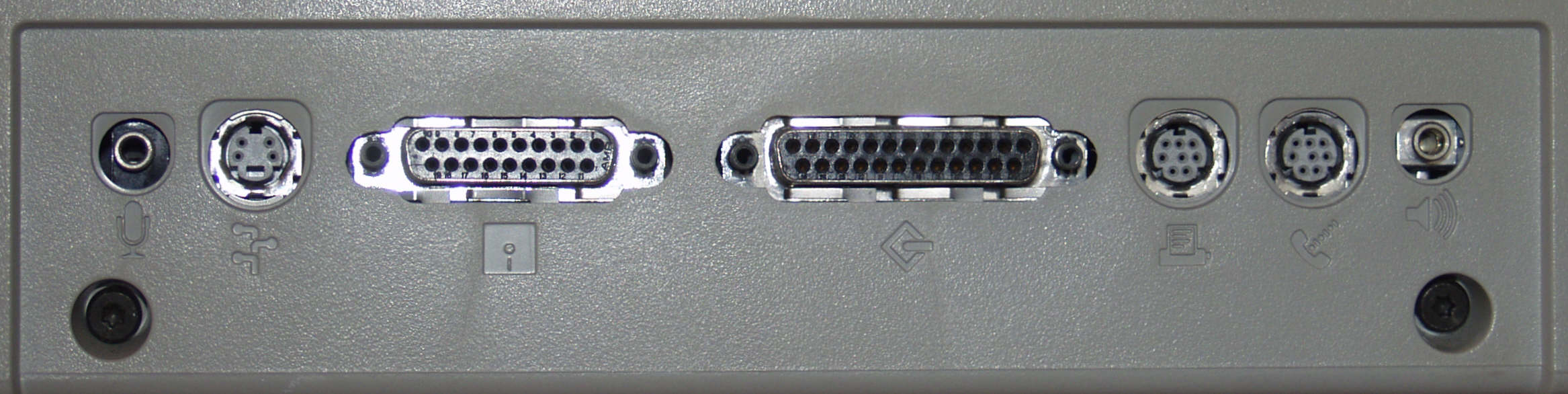
Rear panel showing the ports. From left to right: audio in, ADB, external floppy disk, SCSI, 2 × serial (labeled printer and modem) and audio out. Two TORX case screws are visible, bottom left and right.

Macintosh Classic II specifications
Component	Specification
Processor	Motorola 68030 @ 15.6672 MHz; 32-bit processor with a 16-bit data bus
RAM	2 MB soldered to the main logic board, expandable to 10 MB using two 100 ns 30-pin SIMMs
ROM	512 KB socketed to main logic board, expandable to 1 or 2 MB. Additional ROM could be installed on an expansion card.
Display	9-inch monochrome CRT, 512 × 342 pixels
Audio	8-bit mono at 22 kHz
Hard drive	40 or 80 MB SCSI
Floppy drive	3 1/2-inch 1.44 MB SuperDrive
Addressing	24-bit or 32-bit
Battery	3.6 V lithium
Rear connectors	ADB port; two mini-DIN 8 RS-422 serial ports (labeled printer and modem); DB-25 SCSI port; DB-19 external floppy drive port; 3.5 mm audio input and output jacks

The Classic II has a 50-pin internal expansion slot intended for a floating-point unit (FPU) or additional ROM. The slot was not designed for general-purpose expansion, and Apple did not produce an expansion card for it. Third-party options included the FastMath Classic II FPU from Applied Engineering and synchronous 16 MHz and asynchronous 50 MHz Motorola 68882 FPUs from Sonnet. Hobbyists have since developed open-source designs for the slot.

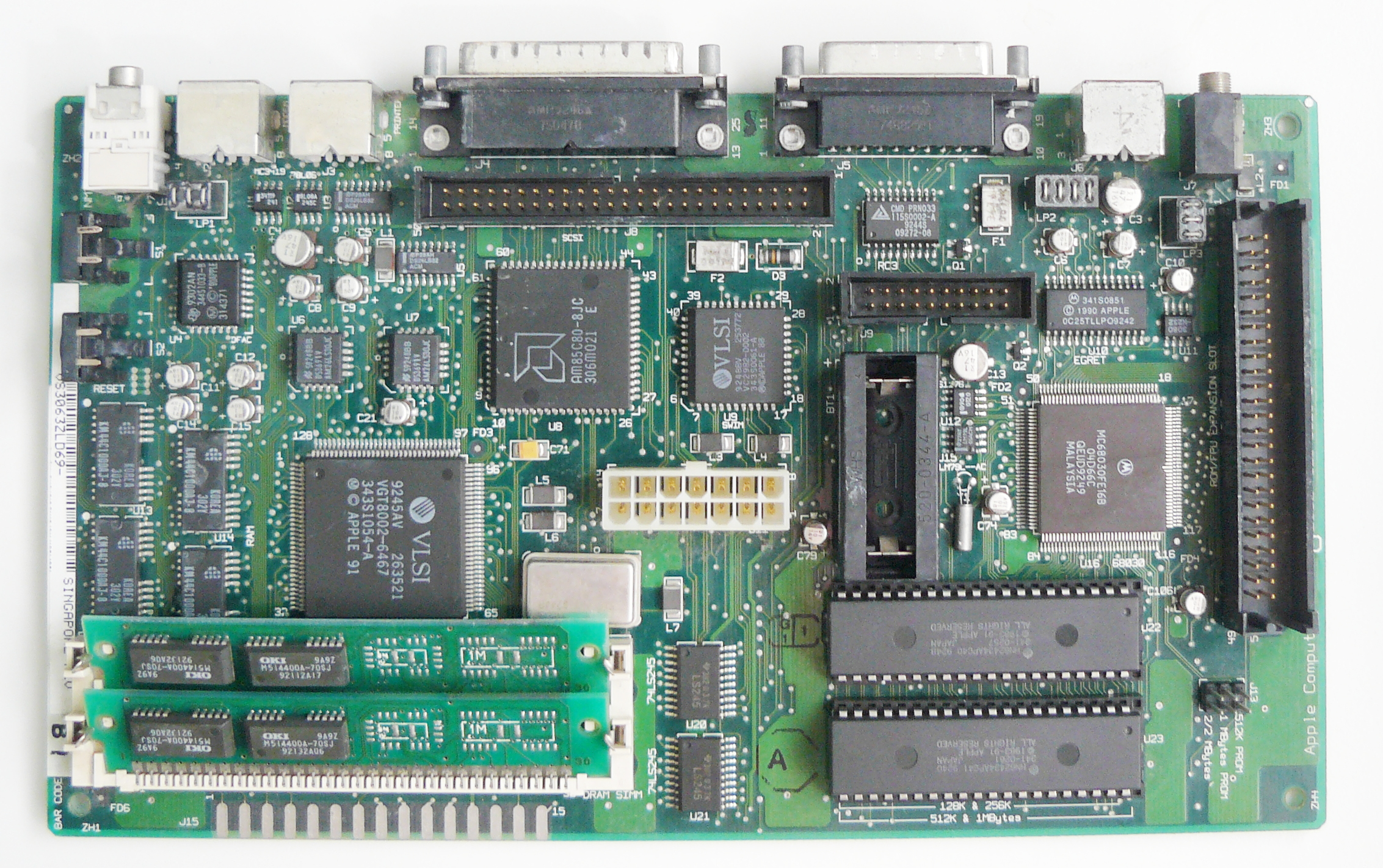
Macintosh Classic II main board (annotated version)

The Classic II's main circuit board contains the computer's system logic, while high-voltage components, including the power supply and CRT driver circuitry, are located on a separate analog board. The Motorola 68030 processor is on the right side of the main board, next to the FPU/ROM expansion slot. Two ROM chips in sockets sit below the processor. The memory is at the lower left; the board shown has 4 MB installed: 2 MB soldered to the board and another 2 MB in SIMM sockets. Above the memory is Apple's "Eagle" gate array, which manages video generation, audio generation and capture, memory mapping and glue logic. An AMD-manufactured "combo" SCSI controller and serial interface chip is located above Eagle, near the internal and external connectors it controls. A battery holder for parameter RAM (PRAM) is to the left of the processor, with the internal floppy drive connector above it and the floppy controller to the left. An 8-bit "Egret" ASIC to the right of the floppy connector manages the ADB bus.

== Gallery ==
Back of the Classic II
The interrupt (left) and reset (right) buttons protruding from the air vent on the lower left hand side of the Classic II. The interrupt button (also called the programmer's key) is used to access a debugger.
The ADB keyboard that shipped with the Classic II. On many Macs the large button at the top near the Apple logo was used to power on the machine. However, this feature was unsupported by the Classic II. The keyboard contained two ADB connectors. One connected into the back of the Macintosh, the other was used for connecting the mouse or other peripherals. The mouse could be connected to either side for left- or right-handed use.
The ADB mouse that shipped with the Classic II.

== Timelines ==
Timeline of Compact Macintosh models
See also: List of Mac models and Compact Macintosh

Timeline of Macintosh Centris, LC, Performa, and Quadra models, colored by CPU type

See also: List of Mac models
