= Power Macintosh 5400 =

Personal computer by Apple Computer

Power Macintosh 5400 / Macintosh Performa 5400/5410/5420/5430/5440
- Developer: Apple Computer
- Product family: Power Macintosh, Performa
- Type: All-in-one
- Released: February 17, 1996
- Discontinued: March 1, 1998
- Operating system: System 7.5.3 – Mac OS 9.1
- CPU: PowerPC 603ev @ 120–200 MHz
- Dimensions: 17.5 × 16 × 15.1 in (44 × 41 × 38 cm)
- Weight: 47 lb (21 kg)
- Predecessor: Power Macintosh 5200 LC
- Successor: Power Macintosh G3 All-In-One
- Related: Power Macintosh 5500

The Power Macintosh 5400 (also sold under variations of the name Performa 5400) is a personal computer designed, manufactured and sold by Apple Computer from April 1996 to March 1998. The 5400 is an all-in-one computer with an integrated monitor, and replaced the Power Macintosh 5200 LC in that role.

The 5400 was the first to use the "Alchemy" motherboard that would later be used in the Power Macintosh 6300 desktop and Power Macintosh 6400 mini-tower.

This is the first all-in-one Macintosh to support PCI expansion, replacing the Processor Direct Slot.

Unlike other Power Macintosh machines of the time, the 5400 was only sold to education markets. Macintosh Performa-branded variants were generally only sold in Europe, Asia and Australia while the less-powerful Performa 5300CD remained on sale in the Americas for much of 1996.

The more powerful Power Macintosh 5500 was introduced in April 1997, and both computers continued to be sold alongside each other. When the education-only Power Macintosh G3 All-In-One was introduced in early 1998, the 5400 and 5500 were both discontinued.

== Hardware ==
The 5400 has one PCI slot replacing the LC-based Processor Direct Slot found in previous models, and an L2 cache slot for an optional L2 cache card. It uses a 15" shadow mask CRT with a 12.8" viewable size as the monitor, with resolutions ranging from 640x480 up to 832x624.

A PC Compatibility Card could be installed in the PCI card slot, adding a Intel Pentium (or compatible Cyrix) processor and enabling the computer to run Microsoft Windows.

== Models ==
Introduced April 15, 1996:

- Power Macintosh 5400/120: Base education version with 16 MB RAM and a 120 MHz processor.

Introduced April 22, 1996:

- Macintosh Performa 5400CD: Consumer version of the 5400/120.

Introduced May 28, 1996:

- Macintosh Performa 5410: Rebranded 5400CD for the Japanese market.
- Macintosh Performa 5420: A black-case version of the 5400CD for the Japanese market. Included video input, TV/FM radio tuner, and 256 KB of cache.

Introduced August 5, 1996:

- Macintosh Performa 5400/160: Australia- and Europe-only version with a 160 MHz CPU and 16 MB soldered RAM.
- Macintosh Performa 5400/180: Asia- and Europe-only 180 MHz variant in a black case.

(unknown introduction):

- Macintosh Performa 5400/180 Director's Edition: Australia-only variant of the 5400/180 configured with 24 MB of RAM, a built in TV tuner with remote control, and 2.4 GB hard drive. Referred to as the "5420/180" in servicing documentation.

Introduced October 1, 1996:

- Power Macintosh 5400/180: Same as the 5400/120, but with a 180 MHz processor.

Introduced November 12, 1996:

- Macintosh Performa 5430: Japan-only rebrand of the 5400/160.
- Macintosh Performa 5440: Japan-only version of the 5400/180. Included TV/FM radio tuner and black case of the 5420. Referred to as the "5420/180" in servicing documentation.

Introduced February 17, 1997:

- Power Macintosh 5400/200: Education version with 24 MB RAM and a 200 MHz processor

== Timeline ==
Timeline of Power Macintosh models
See also: List of Mac models
