= Power Macintosh 6500 =

Personal computer by Apple

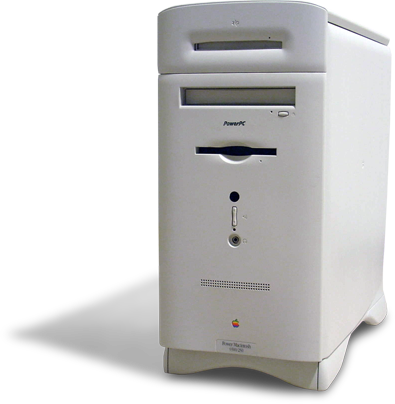
- A Power Macintosh 6500
- Also known as: "Gazelle"
- Developer: Apple Computer
- Product family: Power Macintosh
- Released: February 17, 1997
- Introductory price: US$1,800 (equivalent to $3,530 in 2024)
- Discontinued: March 14, 1998
- Operating system: System 7.5.5 (7.6.1 on the 275 and 300 MHz models) (8.0 on the Home, Small Business & Creative Studio Edition models) - Mac OS 9.1; With PowerPC G3 upgrade, Mac OS 9.2.2
- CPU: PowerPC 603ev @ 225–300 MHz
- Memory: 32 MB, expandable to 128 MB (60 ns 168-pin DIMM)
- Predecessor: Power Macintosh 6400
- Successor: Power Macintosh G3 (Mini Tower)

The Power Macintosh 6500 is a personal computer designed, manufactured and sold by Apple Computer from February 1997 to March 1998 as part of the Power Macintosh family. It was introduced with speeds of 225 and 250 MHz, with two faster models at 275 and 300 MHz being added a couple of months later.

The 6500 uses the same "InstaTower" case as the Power Macintosh 6400, and is also internally similar. However, there are some differences apart from the faster processor: The 6500 has no RAM soldered to the logic board (the 6400 had 8 MB, which also explains its higher memory ceiling), and uses a different graphics processor. Models from 250 MHz upward also include video in/out capability, some of them with a hardware-accelerated Avid capture card. Some models also include a Zip drive. The Power Macintosh 5500 uses the same logic board in a 5200 style all-in-one case.

According to Apple, the Power Macintosh 6500 was the first personal computer to reach 300 MHz. This milestone was announced in conjunction with a three-day "technology fair" from April 4 to 6, 1997 at Walt Disney World, co-hosted by Apple and Disney.

The 6500 was discontinued in March 1998, a few months after the Power Macintosh G3 Mini Tower was introduced.

== Models ==
Introduced February 17, 1997:

- Power Macintosh 6500/225
- Power Macintosh 6500/250

Introduced April 4, 1997:

- Power Macintosh 6500/275
- Power Macintosh 6500/300

Introduced September 15, 1997:
All machines include a 12× CD-ROM drive and a 33.6 kbit/s modem.

- Power Macintosh 6500/225 Home Edition: 4 GB hard drive. US$1,600.
- Power Macintosh 6500/250 Home Edition: 4 GB hard drive. US$2,000.
- Power Macintosh 6500/275 Home Edition: 4 GB hard drive. US$2,500.
- Power Macintosh 6500/275 Small Business Edition: 4 GB hard drive. 48 MB memory. Internal 100 MB Iomega zip drive. US$2,800.
- Power Macintosh 6500/275 Creative Studio Edition: 4 GB hard drive, 32 MB memory, 512 KB L2 cache, Avid Cinema card, Apple Video System, TV/FM Radio System.
- Power Macintosh 6500/300 Home Edition: 4 GB hard drive. 64 MB memory. US$3,000.

== Timeline ==
Timeline of Power Macintosh, Pro, and Studio models
See also: List of Mac models
