= Power Macintosh 6400 =

Personal computer by Apple Computer

Power Macintosh 6400 / Performa 6400
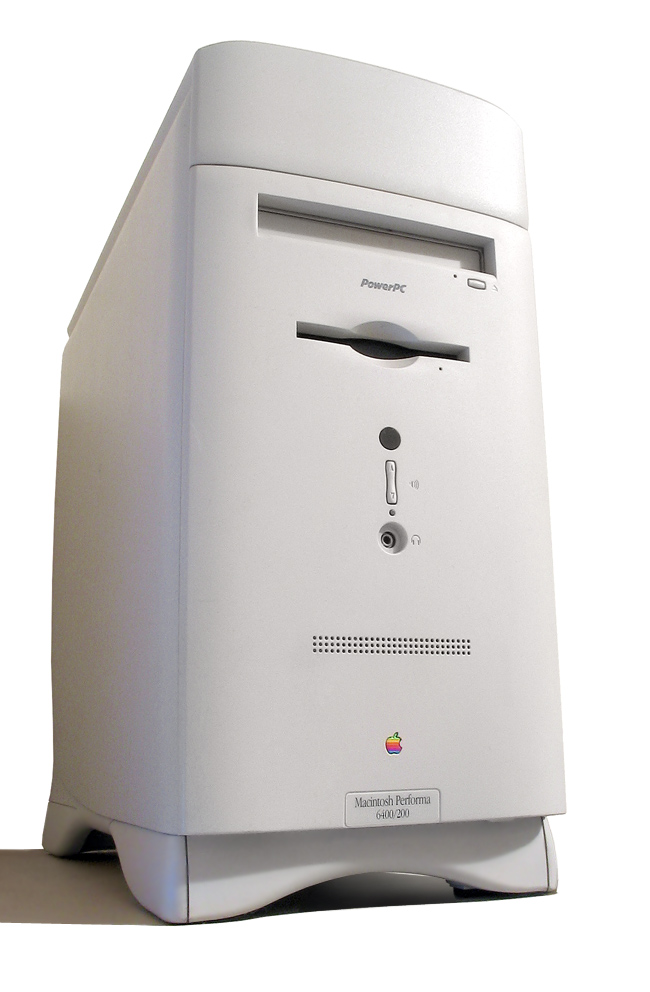
- A Macintosh Performa 6400/200.
- Also known as: "InstaTower"
- Developer: Apple Computer
- Product family: Power Macintosh, Performa
- Released: August 7, 1996
- Introductory price: US$2,400 (equivalent to $4,927 in 2025)
- Discontinued: August 1, 1997
- Operating system: System 7.5.3 - Mac OS 9.1
- CPU: PowerPC 603ev @ 180 or 200 MHz
- Memory: 16 MB, expandable to 136 MB (70 ns 168-pin DIMM)
- Dimensions: Height: 16 inches (41 cm); Width: 7.8 inches (20 cm); Depth: 16.9 inches (43 cm)
- Weight: 44.5 pounds (20.2 kg)
- Successor: Power Macintosh 6500

The Power Macintosh 6400 (also sold under variations of the name Performa 6400) is a personal computer designed, manufactured and sold by Apple Computer from August 1996 to August 1997. It is the only Macintosh mini-tower system to be branded as a Performa, and alongside the Performa 6360 was the last new Performa-branded model introduced by Apple.

The 6400 and its Performa variants were discontinued in favor of the uniformly-named Power Macintosh 6500 in August 1997.

== Hardware ==
Logic board: The logic board, code-named "Alchemy", was shared with and previously used in the Power Macintosh 5400 all-in-one and Power Macintosh 6300 desktop. Alchemy was generally considered to be superior to its low-cost motherboard predecessors since it had a 64-bit data path to main memory.

CPU: All 6400 models use a PowerPC 603ev processor soldered to the logic board and cooled by a heat sink. Although the processor was not designed to be upgraded, third-party CPU upgrades became available that used the computer's Level 2 cache slot.

Sound: The "InstaTower" case has a downward-firing speaker on its underside. It can reproduce the full audio range when used alone, but functions as an integrated subwoofer when external speakers are connected, supporting SRS surround sound. A rear-mounted knob controls the subwoofer's bass level when external speakers are connected. The case has two audio output jacks, one on the front and one on the rear. Connecting headphones to the front jack disables the internal speaker and rear audio output.

Expansion: There are two PCI slots as well as a single Apple Communication Slot II that supports AAUI, Ethernet and modem cards. The communication slot is not compatible with similar slots on other Macintosh computers. PDS and NuBus cards are not supported. A PC Compatibility Card could be installed in the PCI card slot, adding a 100 MHz Cyrix processor and enabling the computer to run Microsoft Windows.

Operating system: The Performa 6400/180 and 6400/200 were shipped with System 7.5.3 Revision 2.1; this particular release was specific to these machines as there were stability problems with System 7.5.3 Release 2 on the new hardware, especially with the video card and transferring files over LocalTalk.

== Models ==
All Performa models shipped with SurfWatch, a product from Spyglass, Inc. that provides adult content filtering capability; content-control software was a significant issue at the time due to the recent passage of the Communications Decency Act in the United States.

Introduced August 5, 1996:

- Performa 6400/180: North American consumer model, 180 MHz CPU.
- Performa 6400/200: North American consumer model, 200 MHz CPU.
- Performa 6400/200 Video Editing Edition: The Performa 6400/200 with an Avid Cinema video I/O card and video editing software, and 32 MB RAM

Introduced October 1, 1996:

- Power Macintosh 6400/200: Sold in the North American and British education markets. US$2,200.

Introduced November 12, 1996:

- Performa 6410: Identical to the Performa 6400/180, sold in Europe and Asia.
- Performa 6420: Identical to the Performa 6400/200, sold in Europe and Asia.

== Timelines ==
Timeline of Power Macintosh models
See also: List of Mac models

Timeline of Macintosh Centris, LC, Performa, and Quadra models, colored by CPU type

See also: List of Mac models
