= Macintosh Quadra 630 =

Personal computer by Apple, Inc.

Macintosh Quadra 630 / LC 630 / Performa 630
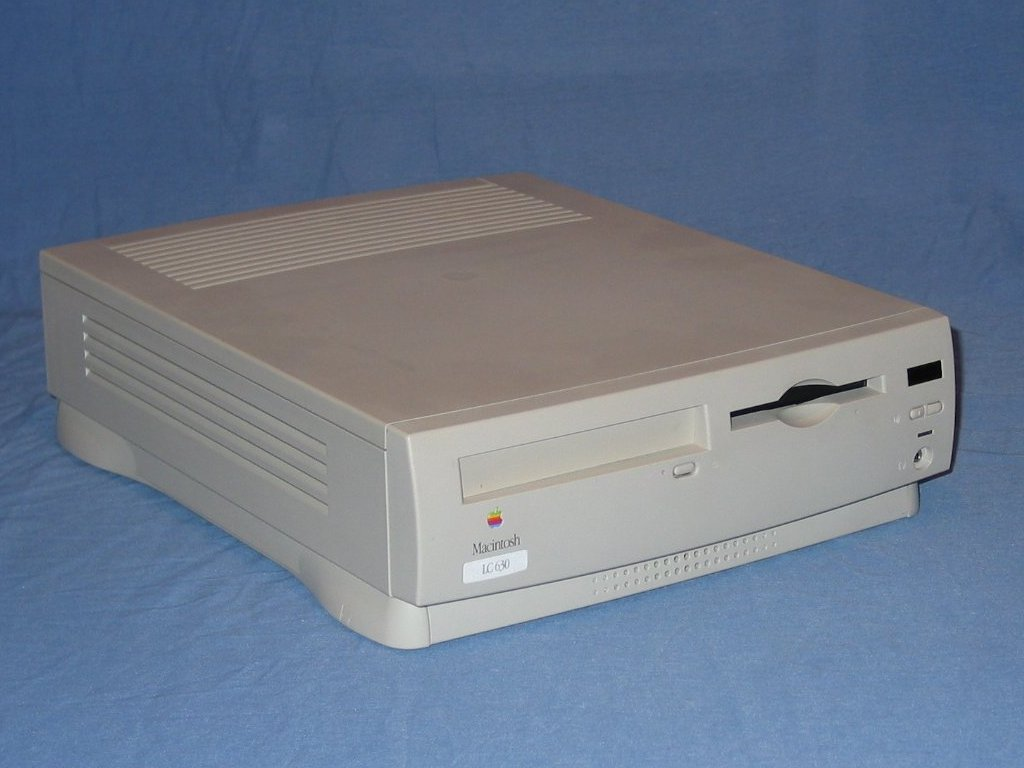
- A Macintosh LC 630
- Also known as: "Crusader", "Show Biz", "Show & Tell"
- Developer: Apple Computer
- Product family: Macintosh Quadra, LC, Performa
- Released: July 18, 1994
- Introductory price: US$1,199 (equivalent to $2,604 in 2025)
- Discontinued: April 17, 1995 (Quadra); February 1, 1996 (Performa variants) March 2, 1996 (LC)
- Operating system: System 7.1.2P – Mac OS 8.1; With PowerPC upgrade: Mac OS 9.1
- CPU: Quadra: Motorola 68040 @ 33 MHz; LC / Performa: 68LC040 @ 33 MHz
- Memory: 4 MB (80 ns 72-pin SIMM)
- Dimensions: 4.3 × 12.6 × 16.5 in (110 × 320 × 420 mm)
- Weight: 19 lb (8.6 kg)
- Predecessor: Macintosh Quadra 610
- Successor: Power Macintosh 6300

The Macintosh Quadra 630 (also sold as the Macintosh LC 630 and Macintosh Performa 630) is a personal computer designed, manufactured and sold by Apple Computer from July 1994 to March 1996. It was introduced as the replacement for the Quadra 610, and was the least-expensive computer in the Macintosh lineup with prices starting at $1,199 USD.

While Apple's transition to PowerPC CPUs had already begun with the introduction of the Power Macintosh a few months prior, the 630 was built around the older Motorola 68040 and 68LC040 chips. Two reasons were cited for this: One, the older chips were less expensive; and two, PowerPC-native education software was almost non-existent at the time. Also, existing PowerPC software had yet to be translated to non-English languages.

The 630 was the last new Macintosh Quadra introduced, though the earlier Quadra 950 remained available longer. It was discontinued with no direct replacement; the 630's form factor was retained with the Power Macintosh 6200 introduced a few months earlier, but with an entry price of $2,300 it cost nearly twice as much. The Power Macintosh 4400 was Apple's most inexpensive Power Macintosh, but at $1,725 still cost several hundred dollars more than the 630.

== Hardware ==
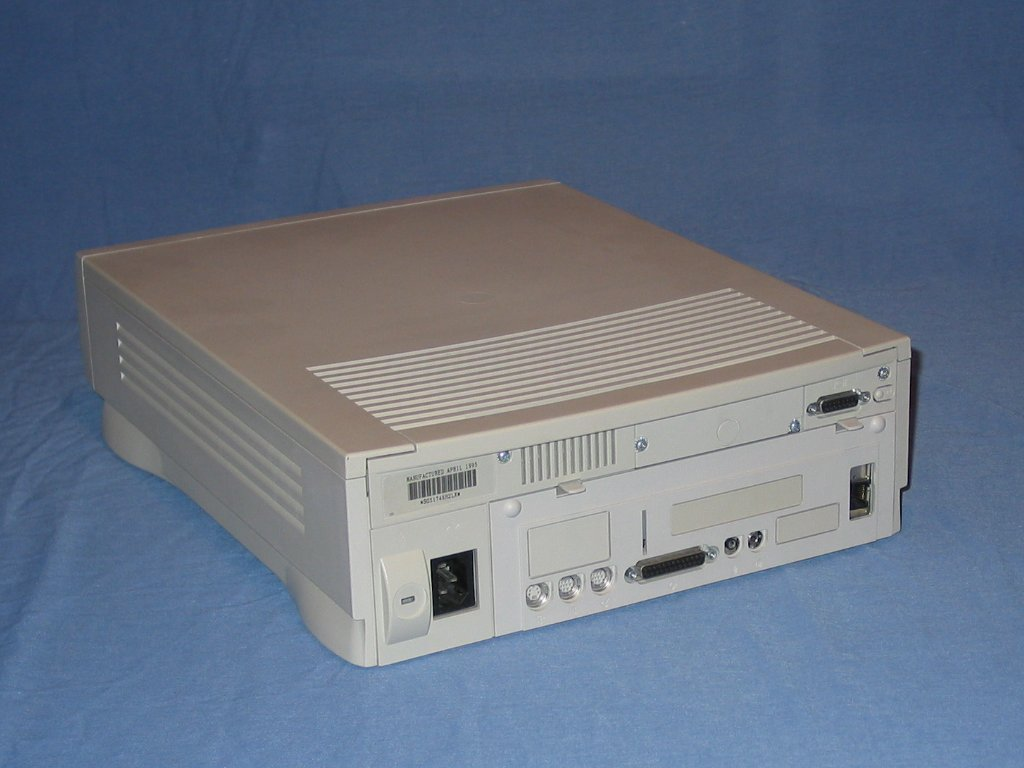
Rear view of a Macintosh LC 630

Form factor: The Quadra 630 introduced a new case design to the Macintosh family. On the front, a headphone jack and volume up/down buttons are included, a first for the Macintosh. There is an infrared receiver, intended for use with the remote included with the TV tuner card included with the Performa 637CD and 638CD models. The case's motherboard is accessible by opening a cover at the bottom rear of the case and sliding out a drawer that the motherboard was mounted on; this similar to the LC 575.

Memory: All 630 models have 4 MB of memory soldered on the logic board. Depending on which logic board is in the system, there is either one or two SIMM slots. In all cases, the first SIMM slot requires 80 ns non-parity chips, with a refresh rate of 2k or better, and 4, 8, 16 or 32 MB SIMMs will work. The second slot supports single-sided SIMM cards only, up to 16 MB in size. Maximum memory is therefore 52 MB for two-slot systems, and 36 MB for one-slot systems.

Hard drive controller: One big difference when compared to previous Macintosh models was the choice of the internal hard drive interface; conforming to the standards of the IBM PC compatible platform, cheaper but slower IDE drives were used instead of SCSI. An external SCSI port was still available, and the CD-ROM used SCSI internally, but the 630 used an older controller that was much slower than the ones used in higher-end Macs of the time.

Video: One external monitor is supported through a DA-15 connector. A non-upgradeable 1 MB of DRAM is soldered to the motherboard; this provides resolution of up to 640×480 with 16-bit color, and 832×624 with 8-bit color. A separate video card is required for 24-bit color or higher resolutions. The choice to use DRAM instead of VRAM saves money due to its commonality, but results in lower performance. In their testing, MacWorld described the video performance of the Quadra 630 as "mediocre".

CD-ROM: Models equipped with a CD-ROM use the Apple CD 300i plus, a 2×-speed SCSI drive capable of reading 656 MB and 748 MB data CDs as well as audio CDs. The caddy tray from the Quadra 610 is replaced with a tray-based loading mechanism.

Remote control: Models equipped with the TV/video system included a Sony RMC-A1 remote control; consequently, the remote would control both the Macintosh and any compatible Sony television at the same time.

Performance: Macworld Magazine ran benchmarks at the time of the Quadra's release and reported that performance is slightly slower than the Quadra 950 which in turn is slightly slower than the Quadra 650, while the Quadra 800 was the fastest. All four models share the same 68040 processor at 33 MHz

== Models ==
The computer series has different names depending on its target market: Quadra 630 for professional use, LC 630 for the K-12 education market, and Performa 630 for the consumer and higher-education markets.

The Performa 630 was sold with several slightly different model numbers, depending on included hardware and software features. Some models included a 14" Shadow mask CRT called the Apple Performa Plus Display.

Introduced July 18, 1994:

- Macintosh Quadra 630: 68040 processor at 33 MHz, with 4 MB of RAM, and a 250 MB hard disk. A 2× CD-ROM was available as an option. US$1,199.
- Macintosh Performa 630: FPU-less 68LC040 processor at 33 MHz, with 4 MB of RAM, and a 250 MB hard disk. Sold in the consumer retail channel. US$1,449.
- Macintosh Performa 630CD: Same as the Performa 630, with a CD-ROM drive. US$1,849.
- Macintosh Performa 635CD: Same as the Performa 630, but with 5 MB RAM, 2× CD-ROM, Apple Multiple Scan 15 Display and a modem US$1,849.
- Macintosh Performa 636: Same as the Performa 630, sold only to the higher-education market. US$1,349.
- Macintosh Performa 636CD: The Performa 636 with a CD-ROM, sold only to the higher-education market. US$1,649.
- Macintosh Performa 637CD: The 636CD with the monitor, and a 350 MB hard disk
- Macintosh Performa 638CD: The 637CD without the monitor, but with a TV/video-in card instead - The Performa 638 CD/V shipped with TV tuner card and 15" Multiple Scan Display.

Introduced November 3, 1994:

- Macintosh LC 630: Same as the Performa 630, sold in the K-12 education market. US$1,299 with 4 MB RAM; $1,949 with 8 MB RAM and a 2× CD-ROM.

Introduced April 3, 1995:

- Macintosh LC 630 DOS Compatible: Same as the LC 630, with a DOS Compatibility Card with an additional 486DX2 processor at 66 MHz and dedicated RAM on a Processor Direct Slot card. This adds the ability to run MS-DOS and Windows 3.1 applications; both operating systems are included with the package. Only sold in the K-12 education market. US$1,899.

Introduced May 1, 1995:

- Macintosh Performa 630CD DOS Compatible: Same as the Performa 630CD, but with a second RAM slot, 8 MB RAM standard, 500 MB hard disk, and a DOS emulation card in the PDS slot.
- Macintosh Performa 640CD DOS Compatible: Same as the Performa 630CD DOS Compatible, sold bundled with a monitor and modem. Not sold in the U.S.

Introduced July 17, 1995:

- Macintosh Performa 631CD: Like the Performa 630CD, but with a second RAM slot, 8 MB RAM standard, 500 MB hard disk and sold bundled with a monitor and modem

== Timeline ==
Timeline of Macintosh Centris, LC, Performa, and Quadra models, colored by CPU type

See also: List of Mac models
