= Spiff =

Immediate bonus for a sale

A spiff, or spiv, is slang for an immediate bonus for a sale. Typically, spiffs are paid, either by a manufacturer or employer, directly to a salesperson for selling a specific product. It is sometimes given as SPIF or SPIFF, a backronym, with invented words to fit the letters.

== Origin ==
An early reference to a spiff can be found in a slang dictionary of 1859; "The percentage allowed by drapers to their young men when they effect sale of old fashioned or undesirable stock." An article in the Pall Mall Gazette of 1890 on the practices in London shops uses the term:

a "spiff" system is usually adopted, spiffs being premiums placed on certain articles, not of the last fashion, indicated by a marvelous hieroglyphic put on the price ticket. These marks are well known by the assistant, and the almost invisible mystic sign explains why an article, wholly unsuitable, is foisted on the jaded customer as "just the thing."

The Oxford English Dictionary suggests that (apart from a corruption of specific) it could be connected with the use of the word in that period to mean a dandy or somebody smartly dressed (hence spiffy, and to spiff up - to improve the appearance of a place or a person), but nobody seems to have been able to disentangle the threads of which came first, or what influenced what, or where the word originally came from.
