= List of Apple codenames =

Codenames given to products by Apple

This list of Apple codenames covers the codenames given to products by Apple during development. The codenames are often used internally only, normally to maintain the secrecy of the project. Occasionally a codename may become the released product's name. Most of Apple's codenames from the 1980s and 1990s are provided by the book Apple Confidential 2.0.

== Accessories ==
=== AirTags ===
- AirTag – B389, Durian
- AirTag 2 – B589

=== AirPorts ===
- AirPort Base Station (1999) – Pogo
- AirPort Time Capsule – Wilma, M52
- AirPort Express 802.11n (5th generation) – K31

=== Home Devices ===
- HomePod – B238
- HomePod Mini – B520
- HomePod Mini 2 – B525
- HomeView – J490
- HomeView Ultra (expected 2027-28) – J595
- Home Camera (unreleased) – J229

=== Other ===
- Apple IIe Card for the Macintosh LC – Double Exposure
- Apple II 3.5" Disk Controller Card – NuMustang
- Apple Color OneScanner 600/27 – Rio
- Apple Color OneScanner 1200/30 – New Orleans
- Built-in iSight (2005) – M33
- External iSight (2003) – Q8
- Lightning Digital AV Adapter – Haywire
- Magic Trackpad 2 – D67
- MagSafe (wireless charger) – B390

== Audio Devices ==
=== AirPods ===
- AirPods (1st generation) – B188
- AirPods (2nd generation) – B288
- AirPods (3rd generation) – B688
- AirPods (4th generation without noise cancellation) – B768e
- AirPods (4th generation with noise cancellation) – B768m
- AirPods (5th generation without wireless charging case) – B868e
- AirPods (5th generation with wireless charging case) – B868m

=== AirPods Pro ===
- AirPods Pro – B298
- AirPods Pro 2 – B698
- AirPods Pro 3 – B788
- AirPods Pro 4 – B790 (cancelled), B798

=== AirPods Max ===
- AirPods Max – B515
- AirPods Max with USB-C – B515c
- AirPods Max 2 – B515d

=== Beats ===
- Beats Flex – B372

== Apple TV ==
- Apple TV – iTV
- Apple TV (2nd generation) – K66
- Apple TV (3rd generation) – J33
- Apple TV HD – J42
- Apple TV 4K – J105
- Apple TV 4K (2nd generation) – J305
- Apple TV 4K (3rd generation) – J255
- Apple TV 4K (4th generation) – J265
- Siri Remote (1st generation) – B239
- Siri Remote (1st generation Rev A) – B439

== Apple Watch ==
- Apple Watch (1st generation) – Gizmo, N27a (small), N28a (big)
- Apple Watch Series 1 – N27d (small), N28d (big)
- Apple Watch Series 2 – N74 (small), N75 (big)
- Apple Watch Series 3 Wi-Fi – N121s (small), N121b (big)
- Apple Watch Series 3 cellular – N111s (small), N111b (big)
- Apple Watch Series 4 Wi-Fi – N131s (small), N131b (big)
- Apple Watch Series 4 cellular – N141s (small), N141b (big)
- Apple Watch Series 5 Wi-Fi – N144s (small), N144b (big)
- Apple Watch Series 5 cellular – N146s (small), N146b (big)
- Apple Watch Series 6 Wi-Fi – N157s (small), N157b (big)
- Apple Watch Series 6 cellular – N158s (small), N158b (big)
- Apple Watch Series 7 Wi-Fi – N187s (small), N187b (big)
- Apple Watch Series 7 cellular – N188s (small), N188b (big)
- Apple Watch Series 8 Wi-Fi – N197s (small), N197b (big)
- Apple Watch Series 8 cellular – N198s (small), N198b (big)
- Apple Watch Ultra – N199s (small), N199b (big)
- Apple Watch Series 9 Wi-Fi – N207s (small), N207b (big)
- Apple Watch Series 9 cellular – N208s (small), N208b (big)
- Apple Watch Ultra 2 – N210
- Apple Watch Series 10 Wi-Fi – N217s (small), N217b (big)
- Apple Watch Series 10 cellular – N218s (small), N218b (big)
- Apple Watch Ultra 3 – N220
- Apple Watch Series 11 Wi-Fi – N227s (small), N227b (big)
- Apple Watch Series 11 cellular – N228s (small), N228b (big)
- Apple Watch Series 12 Wi-Fi – N237s (small), N237b (big)
- Apple Watch Series 12 cellular – N238s (small), 238b (big)
- Apple Watch Ultra 4 – N240
- MicroLED screen – W

== Computers ==
=== Apple ===
- Apple IIGS – Cortland
- Apple IIgs ROM 3 – Tenspeed

In chronological order:

=== Macintosh ===
The first Macintosh was released in 1984:

- Macintosh 128K – Macintosh
- Macintosh 512k, 512ke – Fat Mac
- Macintosh XL – Lisa
- Macintosh Plus – Mr. T
- Macintosh SE simulation – Aladdin
- Macintosh SE FDHD – Aladdin
- Macintosh SE FDHD – Chablis
- Macintosh SE/30 – Fafnir
- Macintosh SE – Freeport
- Macintosh SE FDHD – Freeport
- Macintosh SE/30 – Green Jade
- Macintosh SE – Maui
- Macintosh SE FDHD – Maui
- Macintosh SE – PlusPlus
- Macintosh SE FDHD – PlusPlus
- Macintosh II – Becks
- Macintosh II – Cabernet
- Macintosh II – Ikki
- Macintosh II – Little Big Mac
- Macintosh II – Milwaukee
- Macintosh II – Paris
- Macintosh II – Reno
- Macintosh II – Uzi
- Macintosh IIcx – Atlantic
- Macintosh IIcx – Aurora
- Macintosh IIcx – Cobra
- Macintosh IIci – Aurora II
- Macintosh IIci – Cobra II
- Macintosh IIci – Pacific
- Macintosh IIci – Stingray
- Macintosh IIfx – Weed Whacker
- Macintosh IIfx – Zone 5
- Macintosh IIfx – Blackbird
- Macintosh IIfx – Four Square
- Macintosh IIfx – F-16
- Macintosh IIfx – F-19
- Macintosh IIfx – IIxi
- Macintosh IIfx – Stealth
- Macintosh IIsi – Erickson
- Macintosh IIsi – Oceanic
- Macintosh IIsi – Raffica
- Macintosh IIsi – Ray Ban
- Macintosh IIvi – Brazil 32c
- Macintosh IIvx – Brazil 16c
- Macintosh IIx – Spock
- Macintosh IIx – Stratos
- Macintosh Portable – Espirit
- Macintosh Portable – Laguna
- Macintosh Portable – Malibu
- Macintosh LC – Elsie
- Macintosh LC – Pinball
- Macintosh LC – Prism
- Macintosh LC 580 – Dragonkid
- Macintosh LC III – Elsie III
- Macintosh LC II – Foster Farms
- Macintosh LC 520 – Hook
- Macintosh LC 550 – Hook 33
- Macintosh LC 575 – Optimus
- Macintosh LC III – Vail
- Macintosh Classic II – Apollo
- Macintosh Classic – Civic
- Macintosh Classic II – Montana
- Macintosh Color Classic – Slice
- Macintosh Classic – XO
- Macintosh Quadra 605 – Aladdin
- Macintosh Quadra 605 – Primus
- Macintosh Quadra 610 – Speedbump 610
- Macintosh Quadra 630 – Crusader
- Macintosh Quadra 630 – Show Biz
- Macintosh Quadra 630 – Show & Tell
- Macintosh Quadra 650 – Speedbump 650
- Macintosh Quadra 660AV – Tempest
- Macintosh Quadra 700 – Evo 200
- Macintosh Quadra 700 – IIce
- Macintosh Quadra 700 – Shadow
- Macintosh Quadra 700 – Spike
- Macintosh Quadra 800 – Fridge
- Macintosh Quadra 800 – Wombat 33
- Macintosh Quadra 840AV – Typhoon
- Macintosh Quadra 840AV – Quadra 1000
- Macintosh Quadra 840AV – Cyclone
- Macintosh Quadra 900 – Darwin
- Macintosh Quadra 900 – Eclipse
- Macintosh Quadra 900 – IIex
- Macintosh Quadra 900 – Premise 500
- Macintosh Quadra 950 – Amazon
- Macintosh Quadra 950 – Zydeco
- Macintosh TV – LD50, Peter Pan
- Twentieth Anniversary Macintosh – Pomona
- Twentieth Anniversary Macintosh – Smoke and Mirrors
- Twentieth Anniversary Macintosh – Spartacus

==== eMac ====
The first eMac was released in 2002

- eMac (ATI Graphics) – Northern Lights
- eMac – P69
- eMac (2005) – Q86J

==== iBook ====
The first iBook was released in 1999.

- iBook (FireWire) – P1.5
- iBook (32 MB VRAM) – P72B
- iBook (800/900 MHz 32 MB VRAM) – P73D
- iBook – Bismol
- iBook – Lanai
- iBook G3 (Dual USB) – Marble
- iBook – P1
- iBook (14.1 LCD) – Son of Pismo
- iBook (Dual USB) – P29
- iBook (14.1 LCD) – P54
- iBook (Opaque 16 MB VRAM) – P72B
- iBook (late 2001) – P92
- iBook G4 (early 2004) – Q72
- iBook G4 (mid-2005) – Q72B
- iBook G4 (early 2004) – Q73
- iBook G4 (mid-2005) – Q73B

==== iMac ====
The first iMac was released in 1998.

- iMac G3 (Bondi Blue) – Mac Man and Columbus
- iMac G3 (Bondi Blue) – C1
- iMac G3 (Bondi Blue) – Elroy
- iMac G3 (Bondi Blue) – Tailgate
- iMac G3 (5 Flavors) – Life Savers
- iMac G3, iMac DV, iMac DV+, iMac DV SE – Kihei, P7
- iMac G3 (summer 2001) – Kiva
- iMac G4 (USB 2.0; 15-inch & 17-inch) – Horizon, Q26B, Q26C
- iMac G4 (17-inch Flat Panel) – P79
- iMac G4 (flat panel) – Tessera, P80
- iMac G5 (17-inch, 20-inch) – Hero
- iMac G5 (20-inch) – Fino, M23
- iMac G5 (Ambient Light Sensor) 17-inch Q45C
- iMac G5 (Ambient Light Sensor) 20-inch Q45D
- iMac G5 iSight (17-, 20-inch) – Q87
- iMac (21.5-inch, Late 2012) - J30
- iMac (27-inch, Late 2012) - J31
- iMac (24-inch, 2x USB-C, M1, 2021) - J457
- iMac (24-inch, 4x USB-C, M1, 2021) - J456
- iMac (24-inch, 2x USB-C, M3, 2023) - J433
- iMac (24-inch, 4x USB-C, M3, 2023) - J434
- iMac (24-inch, 2x USB-C, M4, 2024) - J623
- iMac (24-inch, 4x USB-C, M4, 2024) - J624
- iMac (24-inch, 2x USB-C, M6, 2026) - J833
- iMac (24-inch, 4x USB-C, M6, 2026) - J834

==== Mac mini ====
The first Mac mini was in 2005.

- Mac mini (early 2006) – Kaleidoscope
- Mac mini – Twiggy, Q88
- Mac mini (M1, 2020) – J274
- Mac mini (M2, 2022) – J473
- Mac mini (M2, 2023) – J474
- Mac mini (M4, 2024) – J773

==== Mac Pro ====
- Mac Pro (Mid-2012) & Mac Pro Server (Mid-2012) K5B
- Mac Pro (2013) J90
- Mac Pro (2023) – J180

==== Mac Studio ====
- Mac Studio (M1, 2022) - J375
- Mac Studio (M2, 2023) - J475

==== MacBook ====
- MacBook (12-inch) – Stealth
- MacBook (Early-2006) – M42

==== MacBook Air ====
- MacBook Air (11-inch, Mid-2012) J11
- MacBook Air (13-inch, Mid-2012) J13
- MacBook Air (11-inch, Mid-2013) – J41
- MacBook Air (M1, 2020) – J313
- MacBook Air (13-inch, M2, 2022) – J413
- MacBook Air (15-inch, M2, 2023) – J415
- MacBook Air (13-inch, M3, 2024) – J613
- MacBook Air (15-inch, M3, 2024) – J615
- MacBook Air (13-inch, M4, 2025) – J713
- MacBook Air (15-inch, M4, 2025) – J715
- MacBook Air (13-inch, M5, 2026) – J813
- MacBook Air (15-inch, M5, 2026) – J815
- MacBook Air (13-inch, M6, 2027) – J913
- MacBook Air (15-inch, M6, 2027) – J915

==== MacBook Pro ====
- MacBook Pro 13" – J52
- MacBook Pro 13" – J130
- MacBook Pro (13-inch, Early 2011) – K90I
- MacBook Pro (15-inch, Early 2011) – K91
- MacBook Pro (17-inch, Early 2011) – K92
- MacBook Pro (13-inch, Late 2011) – K90IA
- MacBook Pro (15-inch, Late 2011) – K91A
- MacBook Pro (17-inch, Late 2011) – K92A
- 13-inch MacBook Pro with Retina Display- D1
- 15-inch MacBook Pro with Retina Display – D2
- MacBook Pro (Retina, 13-inch, Early 2013) – J44
- MacBook Pro (Retina, 15-inch, Early 2013) – J45
- MacBook Pro (Retina, 15-inch, Mid 2015) – J53
- MacBook Pro (13-inch, M1, 2020) – J293
- MacBook Pro (14-inch, M1 Pro/Max, 2021) – J314
- MacBook Pro (16-inch, M1 Pro/Max, 2021) – J316
- MacBook Pro (13-inch, M2, 2022) – J493
- MacBook Pro (14-inch, M2 Pro/Max, 2022) – J414
- MacBook Pro (16-inch, M2 Pro/Max, 2022) – J416
- MacBook Pro (14-inch, M3, 2023) – J504
- MacBook Pro (14-inch, M3 Pro/Max, 2023) – J514
- MacBook Pro (16-inch, M3 Pro/Max, 2023) – J516
- MacBook Pro (14-inch, M4, 2024) – J604
- MacBook Pro (14-inch, M4 Pro/Max, 2024) – J614
- MacBook Pro (16-inch, M4 Pro/Max, 2024) – J616
- MacBook Pro (14-inch, M6, 2026) – J804
- MacBook Pro with PROLED XDR display (14-inch, M5 Pro/Max) – K114
- MacBook Pro with PROLED XDR display (16-inch, M5 Pro/Max) – K116

==== Macbook Neo ====
- MacBook Neo (A18 Pro, 2026) – J700, Neo
- MacBook Neo (A19 Pro, expected 2027) – J701

==== PowerBook ====
- PowerBook 100 – Asahi
- PowerBook 100 – Derringer
- PowerBook 100 – Rosebud
- PowerBook 100 – Sapporo
- PowerBook 145 – Colt 45
- PowerBook 145B – Colt 45
- PowerBook 140 – Tim Lite
- PowerBook 170 – Tim
- PowerBook 170 – Road Warrior
- PowerBook 160 – Brooks
- PowerBook 165 – Dart LC
- PowerBook 180 – Converse
- PowerBook 180 – Dartanian
- PowerBook 165c – Monet
- PowerBook 180c – Hokusai
- PowerBook 150 – Jedi
- PowerBook 190 – Omega
- PowerBook 190cs – Omega
- PowerBook 540, 540c, 550c, 500 with PowerPC – Blackbird
- PowerBook 520, 520c, 550c, 500 with PowerPC- Blackbird LC
- PowerBook 540/540c – Spruce Goose
- PowerBook 540, 540c, 550c, 500 with PowerPC – SR-71
- PowerBook 1400c, 1400cs – Epic
- PowerBook 2400c/180 – Comet
- PowerBook 2400c/240 – Mighty Cat
- PowerBook 2400c – Nautilus
- PowerBook 3400c Hooper
- PowerBook 5300 Series Mustang
- PowerBook 5300 – M2
- PowerBook Duo 210, 230- BOB W (Best of Both Worlds)
- PowerBook Duo 210, 230 – Cinnamon
- PowerBook Duo 210, 230 – DBLite
- PowerBook Duo 250 – Ansel
- PowerBook Duo 270c – Escher
- PowerBook Duo 280/280c – Yeager
- PowerBook Duo 2300c/100 – AJ
- PowerBook Duo Dock/Plus/II – Gemini
- PowerBook G3 (1997) – PowerBook 3500
- PowerBook G3 (1997) – Kanga
- PowerBook G3 (May 1998) – Mainstreet
- PowerBook G3 (May 1998) – Wallstreet
- PowerBook G3 (August 1998) – PDQ
- PowerBook G3 (Bronze Keyboard) – 101
- PowerBook G3 (Bronze Keyboard) – Lombard
- PowerBook (FireWire) – 102
- PowerBook (FireWire) – P8
- PowerBook (FireWire) – Pismo
- PowerBook G4 – Mercury
- PowerBook G4 – 103
- PowerBook G4 (DVI) – Ivory
- PowerBook G4 (Gigabit Ethernet) – Onyx
- PowerBook G4 (Gigabit Ethernet) – P25
- PowerBook G4 Titanium (1 GHz/867 MHz) – P88
- PowerBook G4 (12-inch) – P99
- PowerBook G4 (15-inch FW800) – Q16
- PowerBook G4 (15-inch 1.5/1.33GHz) – Q16A
- PowerBook G4 (17-inch) – Hammerhead
- PowerBook G4 (17-inch 1.33GHz) – Q41
- PowerBook G4 (17-inch 1.5 GHz) – Q41A
- PowerBook G4 (12-inch DVI) – Q54
- PowerBook G4 (12-inch 1.33 GHz) – Q54A
- PowerBook G5 (EVT1) – Q51

==== PowerMacintosh ====
- Unreleased Hi-end Power Macintosh project (1996) – Halo
- Power Macintosh 4400, 150 MHz Tanzania
- Power Macintosh 4400, 160 MHz Frosty
- Power Macintosh 4400, 200 MHz Cupid
- Power Macintosh 5200/5300 LC – Bongo
- Power Macintosh 5200/5300 LC – Rebound
- Power Macintosh 5200/5300 LC – Trailblazer
- Power Macintosh 5200/5300 LC – Transformer
- Power Macintosh 5400 – Chimera
- Power Macintosh 5400 – Excalibur
- Power Macintosh 5500 – Phoenix
- Power Macintosh 6100 – Piltdown Man
- Power Macintosh 6200 – Crusader
- Power Macintosh 6300 – Elixir
- Power Macintosh 6400 – Hacksaw
- Power Macintosh 6400 – InstaTower
- Power Macintosh 6500 – Gazelle
- Power Macintosh 7100 – Carl Sagan
- Power Macintosh 7100 – BHA (Butt-Head Astronomer)
- Power Macintosh 7100 – LAW (Lawyers Are Wimps)
- Power Macintosh 7200 – Catalyst
- Power Macintosh 7300 – Montana
- Power Macintosh 7500 – TNT
- Power Macintosh 7600 – Montana 7600
- Power Macintosh 8100 – Cold Fusion
- Power Macintosh 8100 – Flagship
- Power Macintosh 8500 – Nitro
- Power Macintosh 8600 – Kansas
- Power Macintosh 9600 – Kansas
- Power Macintosh 9500 – Autobahn
- Power Macintosh 9500 – Tsunami
- Power Macintosh 9700 Prototype PowerExpress
- Power Macintosh G3 All-in-One – Artemis
- Power Macintosh G3 Beige logic board Gossamer
- Power Macintosh G3 (Blue & White) enclosure – El Capitan
- Unreleased Hi-end Power Macintosh enclosure, prototype of El Capitan- Stumpy
- Power Macintosh G3 (Blue & White) – Silk
- Power Macintosh G3 (Blue & White) logic board; Yosemite 1.5 was the revision 2 board Yosemite

==== PowerMac ====
- Power Mac G4 (Digital Audio) – Clockwork
- Power Mac G4 (Digital Audio) – Tangent
- Power Mac G4 (Gigabit Ethernet) – Medusa2
- Power Mac G4 (Gigabit Ethernet) – Mystic
- Power Mac G4 (Gigabit Ethernet) – SnakeBite
- Power Mac G4 (Quicksilver) – Nichrome
- Power Mac G4 (Quicksilver) – Titan
- Power Mac G4 (AGP Graphics) – Sawtooth
- Power Mac G4 (AGP Graphics) – Project E
- Power Mac G4 (AGP Graphics) – P5
- Power Mac G4 (PCI Graphics) logic board – Yikes!
- Power Mac G4 (Mirrored Drive Doors) – P57
- Power Mac G4 (FW 800) – P58
- Power Mac G4 Cube – Rubicon
- Power Mac G4 Cube – Trinity
- Power Mac G4 Cube – P9
- Power Mac G5 – Q37
- Power Mac G5 – Omega
- Power Mac G5 (June 2004) – Q77, Q78
- Power Mac G5 (late 2005) – Cypher

Networking

- Apple Internet Communication Kit — Cyberpup (referencing Cyberdog)
- Data Modem 2400 — Funnelweb (referencing Funnel-web spider)
- eWorld 1.0 — Aladdin
- eWorld 1.1 — Golden Gate
- ISDN NuBus card — CarCraft
- MacTCP — Verduras (Spanish for vegetables)
- MacTerminal 2.0 — SuperPrawn
- MacTerminal II — Killer Bees
- PPP 1.0 — Paris

== iPad ==
=== iPad ===
- iPad (1st generation) – K48
- iPad 2 – K93 (Wi-Fi), K94 (GSM), K95 (CDMA)
- iPad (3rd generation) – J1 (Wi-Fi), J2 (GSM), J2a (CDMA)
- iPad (4th generation) – P101 (Wi-Fi), P102 (GSM), P103 (CDMA)
- iPad (5th generation) – J71 (Wi-Fi), J72 (Cellular)
- iPad (6th generation) – J71b (Wi-Fi), J72b (Cellular)
- iPad (7th generation) – J171 (Wi-Fi), J172 (Cellular)
- iPad (8th generation) – J171a (Wi-Fi), J172a (Cellular)
- iPad (9th generation) – J181 (Wi-Fi), J182 (Cellular)
- iPad (10th generation) – J271 (Wi-Fi), J272 (Cellular)
- iPad (A16) – J481 (Wi-Fi), J482 (Cellular)
- iPad (early 2027) – J581 (Wi-Fi), J582 (Cellular)

=== iPad Mini ===
- iPad mini (1st generation) – P105 (Wi-Fi), P106 (GSM), P107 (CDMA)
- iPad Mini 2 – J85 (Wi-Fi), J86 (GSM), J87 (CDMA)
- iPad Mini 3 – J85m (Wi-Fi), J86m (GSM), J87m (CDMA)
- iPad mini 4 – J96 (Wi-Fi), J97 (Cellular)
- iPad mini (5th generation) – J210 (Wi-Fi), J211 (Cellular)
- iPad mini (6th generation) – J310 (Wi-Fi), J311 (Cellular)
- iPad mini (A17 Pro) – J410 (Wi-Fi), J411 (Cellular)
- iPad mini (A20 Pro) – J510 (Wi-Fi), J511 (Cellular)

=== iPad Air ===
- iPad Air – J71 (Wi-Fi), J72 (GSM), J73 (CDMA)
- iPad Air 2 – J81 (Wi-Fi), J82 (Cellular)
- iPad Air (3rd generation) – J217 (Wi-Fi), J218 (Cellular)
- iPad Air (4th generation) – J307 (Wi-Fi), J308 (Cellular)
- iPad Air (5th generation) – J407 (Wi-Fi), J408 (Cellular)
- iPad Air 11-inch (M2) – J507 (Wi-Fi), J508 (Cellular)
- iPad Air 13-inch (M2) – J537 (Wi-Fi), J538 (Cellular)
- iPad Air 11-inch (M3) – J607 (Wi-Fi), J608 (Cellular)
- iPad Air 13-inch (M3) – J637 (Wi-Fi), J638 (Cellular)
- iPad Air 11-inch (M4) – J707 (Wi-Fi), J708 (Cellular)
- iPad Air 13-inch (M4) – J737 (Wi-Fi), J738 (Cellular)
- iPad Air 11-inch (M5) – J807 (Wi-Fi), J808 (Cellular)
- iPad Air 13-inch (M5) – J837 (Wi-Fi), J838 (Cellular)

=== iPad Pro ===
- iPad Pro 12.9-inch (1st generation) – J98a (Wi-Fi), J199a (Cellular)
- iPad Pro 9.7-inch – J127 (Wi-Fi), J128 (Cellular)
- iPad Pro 10.5-inch – J207 (Wi-Fi), J208 (Cellular)
- iPad Pro 12.9-inch (2nd generation) – J120 (Wi-Fi), J121 (Cellular)
- iPad Pro 11-inch (1st generation) – J317 (Wi-Fi), J318 (Cellular)
- iPad Pro 12.9-inch (3rd generation) – J320 (Wi-Fi), J321 (Cellular)
- iPad Pro 11-inch (2nd generation) – J417 (Wi-Fi), J418 (Cellular)
- iPad Pro 12.9-inch (4th generation) – J420 (Wi-Fi), J421 (Cellular)
- iPad Pro 11-inch (3rd generation) – J517 (Wi-Fi), J518 (Cellular)
- iPad Pro 12.9-inch (5th generation) – J522 (Wi-Fi), J523 (Cellular)
- iPad Pro 11-inch (4th generation) – J617 (Wi-Fi), J618 (Cellular)
- iPad Pro 12.9-inch (6th generation) – J620 (Wi-Fi), J621 (Cellular)
- iPad Pro 11-inch (M4) – J717 (Wi-Fi), J718 (Cellular)
- iPad Pro 13-inch (M4) – J720 (Wi-Fi), J721 (Cellular)
- iPad Pro 11-inch (M5) – J817 (Wi-Fi), J818 (Cellular)
- iPad Pro 13-inch (M5) – J820 (Wi-Fi), J821 (Cellular)
- iPad Pro 11-inch (M6) – J917 (Wi-Fi), J918 (Cellular)
- iPad Pro 13-inch (M6) – J920 (Wi-Fi), J921 (Cellular)

== iPhone ==
- iPhone (first generation) – M68 and Purple or Purple 2
- iPhone 3G – N82
- iPhone 3GS – N88
- iPhone 4 – N90 (GSM), N92 (CDMA)
- iPhone 4S – N94
- iPhone 5 – N41 and N42
- iPhone 5C – N48
- Touch ID – Mesa
- iPhone 5S – N51 and N53
- iPhone 6 – N61
- iPhone 6 Plus – N56
- iPhone SE (1st generation) – N69
- iPhone 6S – N71
- iPhone 6S Plus – N66
- iPhone 7 – D10
- iPhone 7 Plus – D11
- iPhone 8 – D20
- iPhone 8 Plus – D21
- Face ID – Pearl
- iPhone X – D22 and Ferrari
- iPhone XR – N84 and Star or Lisbon or Hangzhou
- iPhone XS – D32
- iPhone XS Max – D33
- iPhone 11 – N104
- iPhone 11 Pro – D42
- iPhone 11 Pro Max – D43
- iPhone 12 mini – D52G
- iPhone 12 – D53G
- iPhone 12 Pro – D52P
- iPhone 12 Pro Max – D52P
- iPhone SE (2nd generation) – D79
- iPhone 13 mini – D16
- iPhone 13 – D17
- iPhone 13 Pro – D63
- iPhone 13 Pro Max – D64
- iPhone SE (3rd generation) – D49
- iPhone 14 – D27
- iPhone 14 Plus – D28
- iPhone 14 Pro – D73
- iPhone 14 Pro Max – D74
- iPhone 15 – D37
- iPhone 15 Plus – D38
- iPhone 15 Pro – D83
- iPhone 15 Pro Max – D84
- iPhone 16 – D47
- iPhone 16 Plus – D48
- iPhone 16 Pro – D93
- iPhone 16 Pro Max – D94
- iPhone 16e – V59
- iPhone 17 – D57
- iPhone 17 Pro – D67
- iPhone 17 Pro Max – D68
- iPhone Air – D58
- iPhone 17e – V159
- iPhone 18 Pro – V63
- iPhone 18 Pro Max – V64
- iPhone Duo – V68
- iPhone 18 – V67
- iPhone Air 2 – V62

== iPod ==
- iPod – Dulcimer
- iPod Classic (5th generation) – M25
- iPod Touch (1st generation) – N45
- iPod Touch (2nd generation) – N72
- iPod Touch (3rd generation) – N18
- iPod Touch (4th generation) – N81
- iPod Touch (5th generation) – N78 and N78a
- iPod Touch (6th generation) – N102

== Other ==
- Apple Vision Pro – N301
- Apple Vision Pro (M5) – N301a
- Apple Vision Pro (2nd generation) – N109 and Project Alaska
- Apple Car – Titan
- 2019 augmented reality prototypes – Garta, Franc, Luck, T288
- Apple's aluminum unibody manufacturing process – Brick
- Apple facility including a regenerative thermal oxidizer to reduce pollution – Magnolia
- Apple Santa Clara, California facilities (Project Titan, MicroLED, iPhone Modularization) – Zeus, Medusa, Pegasus, Athena, and Aria
- Liquid Glass design language - Solarium
- Siri AI – Campos

== Systems on chip & Processors ==
The internal codenames for the CPU cores of Apple silicon A series and M series chips are named after islands, with the cores named after wind and weather patterns.

=== A series ===
- Apple A6 and A6X – Bali, with Swift cores
- Apple A7 – Alcatraz, with Cyclone cores
- Apple A8 – Fiji, with Typhoon cores
- Apple A8X – Capri, with Typhoon cores
- Apple A9 – Maui (Samsung), Malta (TSMC), with Twister cores
- Apple A9X – Elba, with Twister cores
- Apple A10 Fusion – Cayman, with 2 Hurricane cores and 2 Zephyr cores
- Apple A10X Fusion – Myst, with 3 Hurricane cores and 3 Zephyr cores
- Apple A11 Bionic – Skye, with 2 Monsoon cores and 4 Mistral cores
- Apple A12 Bionic – Cyprus, with 2 Vortex cores and 4 Tempest cores
- Apple A12X and A12Z Bionic – Aruba, with 4 Vortex cores and 4 Tempest cores
- Apple A13 Bionic – Cebu, with 2 Lightning and 4 Thunder cores
- Apple A14 Bionic – Sicily, with 2 Firestorm cores and 4 Icestorm cores
- Apple A15 Bionic – Ellis, with 2 Avalanche cores and 4 Blizzard cores
- Apple A16 Bionic – Crete, with 2 Everest cores and 4 Sawtooth cores
- Apple A17 Pro – Coll, with 2 Everest cores and 4 Sawtooth cores
- Apple A18 - Tupai, with 2 Everest cores and 4 Sawtooth cores
- Apple A18 Pro – Tahiti, with 2 Everest cores and 4 Sawtooth cores
- Apple A19 - Tilos with 2 Everest cores and 4 Sawtooth cores
- Apple A19 Pro – Thera with 2 Everest cores and 4 Sawtooth cores
- Apple A20 Pro – Borneo
- Apple silicon (Mac): Kalamata

=== M series ===
- Apple M1 – Tonga, A14X
  - Apple M1 cores – Icestorm efficiency cores and Firestorm performance cores, with Lifuka GPU cores
  - Apple M1 Pro – Jade C-Chop
  - Apple M1 Max – Jade C-Die
  - Apple M1 Ultra – Jade 2C-Die
- Apple M2 – Staten
  - Apple M2 cores – Blizzard efficiency cores and Avalanche performance cores
  - Apple M2 Pro – Rhodes Chop
  - Apple M2 Max – Rhodes 1C
  - Apple M2 Ultra – Rhodes 2C
- Apple M3 – Ibiza
  - Apple M3 Pro – Lobos
  - Apple M3 Max – Palma
- Apple M4 – Donan
  - Apple M4 Pro and Max – Brava
- Apple M5 – Hidra
  - Apple M5 Pro – Sotra
- Apple M6 – Komodo

== Software ==
=== Applications ===
- Apple Fitness+ – Seymour
- AR app – Gobi
- Mac App Store – Firenze
- Apple Music – Fuse
- iMessage – Madrid
- iTunes – iMusic
- Safari (web browser) – Alexander
- QuickTime – Warhol
- Spotlight – Matador
- Swift Playgrounds – Serenity
- Walkie-Talkie – Spartan
- Reminders – Tantor

=== Software Features ===
- Apple Music Sing – Suntory
- Apple Intelligence – Greymatter
- Dynamic Island – Jindo
- iTunes Music Store – Jingle

=== AirPods Firmware ===
For use with AirPods

- Build 1A6XX – Theremin
- Build 2XXXX – Harmonica
- Build 3XXXX – Harpsichord
- Build 4XXXX – Piccolo

=== audioOS ===
For use with HomePod

- audioOS 11.0.2 – Cinar
- audioOS 11.3 – Emet
- audioOS 11.4 – Fatsa
- audioOS 11.4.1 – Gebze
- audioOS 12.0–12.3 – Peace
- audioOS 13.2–13.3.1 – Yukon
- audioOS 13.4 – Yager
- audioOS 14 – Archer
- audioOS 15 – Satellite
- audioOS 15.1 – Starlinks

=== Classic Mac OS ===
The classic Mac OS is often cited as having multiple codenames. The codename convention for Mac OS 8 and 9 mostly follow musical terminology.

- System 6.0.4 (1989) – Antares
- System 6.0.5 (1990) – Big Deal
- System 6.0.6 – SixPack (never released due to AppleTalk bug)
- System 6.0.8 (1991) – Terminator
- System 7 – Blue, Big Bang, M80 (in reference to the M-80 firecrackers), Pleiades
- System 7's Finder – Furnishings 2000
- System 7's TuneUp — 7Up
- System 7.0.1 (1991) – Road Warrior, Beta Cheese, Regatta
- System 7.1 (1992) – Cube-E, I Tripoli (in reference to IEEE standards)
- System 7.1 Pro (1993) – Jirocho
- Prototype of System 7.1 for x86 processors – Star Trek
- System 7.5 (PPC) (1994) – Mozart, Capone ("to strike fear in the heart of" Windows 95, codenamed Chicago)
- System 7.5 Update 1.0 – Danook (from The Far Side)
- System 7.5 Update 2.0 – Thag (from The Far Side), Zhag
- System 7.5.2 — Marconi (in reference to Guglielmo Marconi)
- System 7.5.3 – Unity ("contains all patches and special software")
- System 7.5.3 Revision 2 – Buster (Amelio's high school nickname)
- System 7.5.5 – Son of Buster (picked for the "SOB" acronym)
- System 7.6 – Harmony
- System 7.6.1 – Ides of Buster
- Mac OS 8 (failed project) – Copland, Maxwell
- Mac OS 8 (released) – Tempo
- Mac OS 8.0 for CHRP: Orient Express
- Mac OS 8.1 – Bride of Buster
- Mac OS 8.5 – Allegro, Scimitar
- Mac OS 8.5.1 – Ric Ford Release, The
- Mac OS 8.6 – Veronica (named after a relative of technical lead Brian Bechtel)
- Mac OS 9.0 – Gershwin, Sonata
- Mac OS 9.0.4 – Minuet
- Mac OS 9.1 –Fortissimo
- Mac OS 9.2 –Moonlight
- Mac OS 9.2.1 –Limelight
- Mac OS 9.2.2 –LU1 (Limelight Update 1)

=== iOS ===
The codename convention for iOS are ski resorts.

- iPhone OS 1.0 – Alpine
- iPhone OS 1.0.1–1.0.2 – SUHeavenlyJuly
- iPhone OS 1.1–1.1.1 – Snowbird
- iPhone OS 1.1.2 – Oktoberfest
- iPhone OS 1.1.3–1.1.5 – Little Bear
- iPhone OS 2.0–2.0.2 – Big Bear
- iPhone OS 2.1–2.1.1 – Sugar Bowl
- iPhone OS 2.2 – Timberline
- iPhone OS 2.2.1 – SUTimberline
- iPhone OS 3.0–3.0.1 – Kirkwood
- iPhone OS 3.1–3.1.2 – Northstar
- iPhone OS 3.1.3 – SUNorthstarTwo
- iPhone OS 3.2–3.2.2 – Wildcat
- iOS 4.0–4.0.2 – Apex
- iOS 4.1 – Baker
- iOS 4.2.1 – Jasper
- iOS 4.2.5–4.2.10 – Phoenix
- iOS 4.3–4.3.5 – Durango
- iOS 5.0–5.0.1 – Telluride
- iOS 5.1–5.1.1 – Hoodoo
- iOS 6.0–6.0.2 – Sundance
- iOS 6.1–6.1.2 – Brighton
- iOS 6.1.3–6.1.6 – BrightonMaps
- iOS 7.0–7.0.2 – Innsbruck
- iOS 7.0.3–7.0.6 – InnsbruckTaos
- iOS 7.1 – Sochi
- iOS 7.1.1 – SUSochi
- iOS 7.1.2 – Sochi
- iOS 8.0–8.0.2 – Okemo
- iOS 8.1 – OkemoTaos
- iOS 8.1.1–8.1.2 – SUOkemoTaos
- iOS 8.1.3 – SUOkemoTaosTwo
- iOS 8.2 – OkemoZurs
- iOS 8.3 – Stowe
- iOS 8.4 – Copper
- iOS 8.4.1 – Donner
- iOS 9.0–9.0.2 – Monarch
- iOS 9.1 – Boulder
- iOS 9.2 – Castlerock
- iOS 9.2.1 – Dillon
- iOS 9.3–9.3.1 – Eagle
- iOS 9.3.2 – Frisco
- iOS 9.3.3–9.3.6 – Genoa
- iOS 10.0.1–10.0.3 – Whitetail
- iOS 10.1–10.1.1 – Butler
- iOS 10.2 – Corry
- iOS 10.2.1 – Dubois
- iOS 10.3–10.3.1 – Erie
- iOS 10.3.2 – Franklin
- iOS 10.3.3–10.3.4 – Greensburg
- iOS 11.0–11.0.3 – Tigris
- iOS 11.1–11.1.2 – Bursa
- iOS 11.2–11.2.2 – Cinar
- iOS 11.2.5–11.2.6 – Dalaman
- iOS 11.3–11.3.1 – Emet
- iOS 11.4 – Fatsa
- iOS 11.4.1 – Gebze
- iOS 12 – Peace
- iOS 13 / iPadOS 13 – Yukon
- iOS 14 / iPadOS 14 – Azul
- iOS 15 / iPadOS 15 – Sky
- iOS 16 / iPadOS 16 – Sydney
- iOS 17 / iPadOS 17 – Dawn
- iOS 18 / iPadOS 18 – Crystal
- iOS 26 / iPadOS 26 – Luck
- iOS 27 / iPadOS 27 – Rave
- iOS 28 / iPadOS 28 – Bell

=== Mac OS X / OS X / macOS ===
The internal codenames of Mac OS X 10.0 through 10.2 are big cats.

In Mac OS X 10.2, the internal codename "Jaguar" was used as a public name, and, for subsequent Mac OS X releases, big cat names were used as public names through until OS X 10.8 "Mountain Lion", and wine names were used as internal codenames through until OS X 10.10 "Syrah".

For OS X releases beginning with 10.9, and for macOS releases, landmarks in California were used as public names.

For OS X releases beginning with 10.11, and for macOS releases, varieties of apples were used as internal code names.

- Mac OS X: Cyan, Siam (in reference to joining Mac OS and Rhapsody)
- Mac OS X Developer Preview 3 – Bunsen
- Mac OS X Developer Preview 4 – Gonzo
- Mac OS X Public Beta – Kodiak
- Mac OS X Public Release 1 – Hera
- Mac OS X Public Release 2 – Beaker
- Mac OS X 10.0 – Cheetah
- Mac OS X 10.1 – Puma
- Mac OS X 10.2 — Jaguar
- Mac OS X 10.2.1 — Red
- Mac OS X 10.2.2 — Blue
- Mac OS X 10.2.3 — Green
- Mac OS X 10.2.4 — Pink
- Mac OS X 10.2.7 — Blackrider, Smeagol
- Mac OS X 10.3 Panther – Pinot
- Mac OS X 10.4 Tiger – Merlot
- Mac OS X 10.4.1 Tiger – Atlanta
- Mac OS X 10.4.4 Tiger (Intel version) – Chardonnay
- Mac OS X 10.5 Leopard – Chablis
- Mac OS X 10.6 Snow Leopard
- Mac OS X 10.7 Lion – Barolo
- OS X 10.8 Mountain Lion – Zinfandel
- OS X 10.9 Mavericks – Cabernet
- OS X 10.10 Yosemite – Syrah
- OS X 10.11 El Capitan – Gala
- macOS 10.12 Sierra – Fuji
- macOS 10.13 High Sierra – Lobo
- macOS 10.14 Mojave – Liberty
- macOS 10.15 Catalina – Jazz
- macOS 11 Big Sur – GoldenGate
- macOS 12 Monterey – Star
- macOS 13 Ventura – Rome
- macOS 14 Sonoma – Sunburst
- macOS 15 Sequoia – Glow
- macOS 26 Tahoe – Cheer
- macOS 27 Golden Gate – Fizz
- macOS 28 – Poppy

==== Mac OS X Server ====
- Mac OS X Server 1.0 – Rhapsody
- Mac OS X Server CR1 — Enterprise (named after "Apple's NeXT division")
- Mac OS X Server DR2 — Titan
- Mac OS X Server 10.2 Jaguar – Tigger

Other operating systems

- Taligent OS — Defiant, Pink

=== tvOS ===
Version:

- 9.0–9.0.1 – MonarchTide
- 9.1 – Tilden
- 9.1.1 – Noble
- 9.2 – Angora
- 9.2.1 – Fern
- 9.2.2 – Gilmore
- 10.0 – Union
- 10.0.1 – Bugle
- 10.1 – Clementine
- 10.1.1 – Diamond
- 10.2 – Emerald
- 10.2.1 – Florence
- 10.2.2 – Gold
- 11.0 – Topaz
- 11.1 – Bass
- 11.2–11.2.1 – Coyote
- 11.2.5–11.2.6 – Dixon
- 11.3 – Eaton
- 11.4 – Francis
- 11.4.1 – Grant
- 12 – Hope
- 13 – Yager
- 14 – Archer
- 15 – Satellite
- 16 – Paris
- 17 – Starlight
- 18 – Sapphire
- 26 – Charisma
- 27 – Lotus

=== watchOS ===
watchOS often follows the codename convention for beaches. All betas carry the following codenames, succeeded by the word "Seed". For example, watchOS 3.2 beta is known as ElectricSeed.

- Apple Watch Electrocardiogram – Cinnamon
- Apple Watch Blood Oxygen – Scandium
- Apple Watch sleep tracking – Burrito

OS versions:

- 1.0 – SkiHill
- 1.0.1 – Bucket
- 2.0 – Bondi
- 2.0.1 – Atlantic
- 2.1 – Bahar
- 2.2 – Coral
- 2.2.1 – Fish
- 2.2.2 – Goldfish
- 3.0 – Daytona
- 3.1 – Blowfish
- 3.1.1 – Catfish
- 3.1.3 – Dogfish
- 3.2 – Electric
- 3.2.2 – Firefish
- 3.2.3 – Ghostfish
- 4.0 – Fortune
- 4.1 – Beluga
- 4.2 – Catamaran
- 4.2.2-4.2.3 – Dolphin
- 4.3 – Emperor
- 4.3.1 – Ferry
- 4.3.1 – Gull
- 5 – Glory
- 6 – Grace
- 7 – Hunter
- 8 – Jupiter
- 9 – Kincaid
- 10 – Lighthouse
- 11 – Moonstone
- 26 – Nepali
- 27 – Orchid

=== visionOS ===
visionOS was internally named Oak during initial development.

- 1 – Borealis
- 2 – Constellation
- 26 – Discovery
- 27 – Eclipse

=== Technologies ===
- Switching from PowerPC to x86 architecture and the Intel chip platform – Marklar
- Mac Catalyst – Marzipan
- A system shell for stereo AR-enabled apps – StarBoard
- AppleShare – Holly Hand Grenade
- CoreMediaIO – Tundra
- Dictation Services – Ironwood
- File sharing extension (fork from AppleShare) – Killer Rabbit
- HFS – Turbo File System (TFS)
- HFS Plus — Sequoia (in reference to b-trees)
- iCloud – Ubiquity
- Toolbox ROM version $077D – SuperMario
- MacInTalk 3.2 Text to Speech (from mis-pronouncing Galatea) – Gala Tea
- MicroLED – T159
- PowerPC Modern Memory Manager PowerPC – Figment
- 32-Bit QuickDraw – Jackson Pollock
- QuickDraw GX – Skia
- CarPlay – Stark

== Services ==
- Apple Card – Broadway
- Apple Cash – Lexington
- Apple Pay – Stockholm
- Apple Financing & Credit – Breakout
- Retail Store Initiative – Nexus
