= LC 500 =

LC 500 may refer to:

- Lexus LC 500, motor vehicle
- Macintosh LC 500 series, series of personal computers
