= Macintosh LC 500 series =

Personal computer series released by Apple Computer

The Macintosh LC 500 series is a series of personal computers that were a part of Apple Computer's Macintosh LC family of Macintosh computers, designed as a successor to the compact Macintosh family of computers for the mid-1990s mainstream education-market. The all-in-one desktop case is similar to the then recently introduced Macintosh Color Classic, but the LC 500 series is considerably bulkier and heavier due to its much larger screen and a bulging midsection to house the larger electronics, including a 14" CRT display, CD-ROM drive, and stereo speakers.

The LC 500 series included four main models, the 520, 550, 575, and 580, with the 520 and 550 both using different speeds of the Motorola 68030, and the 575 and 580 sharing the 33 MHz Motorola 68LC040 processor but differing on the rest of the hardware. All of these computers were also sold to the consumer market through department stores under the Macintosh Performa brand, with similar model numbers. The LC models, in particular, became very popular in schools for their small footprint, lack of cable clutter, and durability. The Macintosh TV, while not branded as an LC, uses the LC 520's case (in black instead of beige) and a logic board similar to the LC 550. The compact Color Classic series shares many components and is able to swap logic boards with the early 500 series machines.

== LC 520 ==
Macintosh LC 520 Macintosh Performa 520
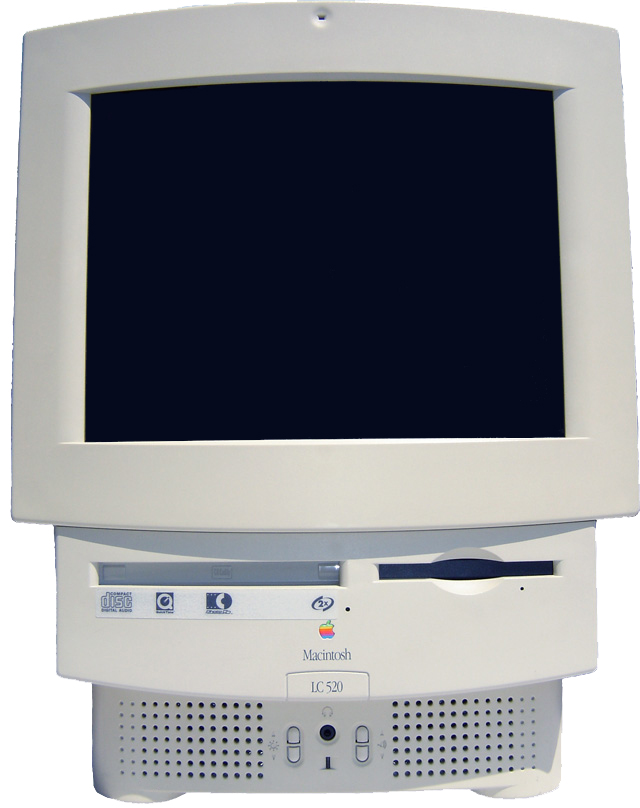
- A Macintosh LC 520
- Also known as: "Hook"
- Developer: Apple Computer
- Product family: LC, Performa
- Released: June 28, 1993
- Introductory price: US$1,599 (equivalent to $3,564 in 2025)
- Discontinued: February 2, 1994
- Operating system: System 7.1-Mac OS 7.6.1; With 68040 upgrade, Mac OS 8.1
- CPU: Motorola 68030 @ 25 MHz
- Memory: 5 MB, expandable to 36 MB (80 ns 72-pin SIMM)
- Display: 14 inches (36 cm)
- Dimensions: Height: 17.9 inches (45 cm); Width: 13.5 inches (34 cm); Depth: 16.5 inches (42 cm)
- Weight: 40.5 pounds (18.4 kg)
- Predecessor: Macintosh LC III
- Successor: Macintosh LC 550; Macintosh LC 575

The Macintosh LC 520 was introduced in June 1993. The case design was larger than the compact Macintosh models that precede it, due in large part to the significantly larger screen and CD-ROM drive.

The LC 520 got its start as a design project codenamed "Mongo". Following the success of the Color Classic, The Apple Industrial Design Group (IDg) began exploring the adaptation of the Color Classic's design language, dubbed Espresso, for a larger display version that would also include a CD-ROM drive. However, IDg hated the design so much that they permanently shelved the final concept. In 1992, Apple CEO John Sculley demanded a large-screen all-in-one design to fill out his market strategy in less than 6 months. Over IDg's objections, Apple's engineering team retrieved the shelved design and promptly put it into production. Because IDg universally detested the design, they immediately began the redesign project that would become the Power Macintosh 5200 LC series less than two years later.

The LC 520 has been described as if you "take an LC III and graft on a 14″ Trinitron monitor along with stereo speakers". The logic board of the 520 is broadly the same as the Macintosh LC III, with a Motorola 68030 CPU and an optional Motorola 68882 FPU.

Peter Lewis of The New York Times praised the LC 520, writing that its $1,599 price point is "perhaps the best value in the entire Macintosh product line ... it would be very difficult to put together a Windows-based PC with the same features for that price, and Windows computers are usually much less expensive than Macs". He regretted the computer's unavailability in the United States outside schools. Lewis also noted that the unit's 40-pound (18 kg) weight would make it difficult to carry home at night. While Apple did not rule out offering it to non-educational customers, MacWEEK wrote that the timing of the LC 520's release coincided with purchasing timelines for schools, and that the decision to market the computer exclusively to the education market was part of a strategic shift to move the LC brand away from retail.

The LC 520 was discontinued in February 1994, when it was replaced by both the faster but otherwise essentially unchanged Macintosh LC 550 and the new, 68LC040-equipped Macintosh LC 575. Apple sold upgrade kits for the LC 520 that brought it to the same specifications as the LC 550 or 575.

=== Models ===
Sold only in Japan and Canada, and to U.S. educational institutions. The computer was discontinued in February 1994. Featured a caddy-loaded CD-ROM drive.

Introduced June 28, 1993:

- Macintosh LC 520: 5 MB RAM, 80 MB HDD. U.S. educational institutions only. US$1,599.
- Macintosh Performa 520: Consumer version of the LC 520. Not sold in the U.S.

== LC 550 ==
Macintosh LC 550 Macintosh Performa 550/560
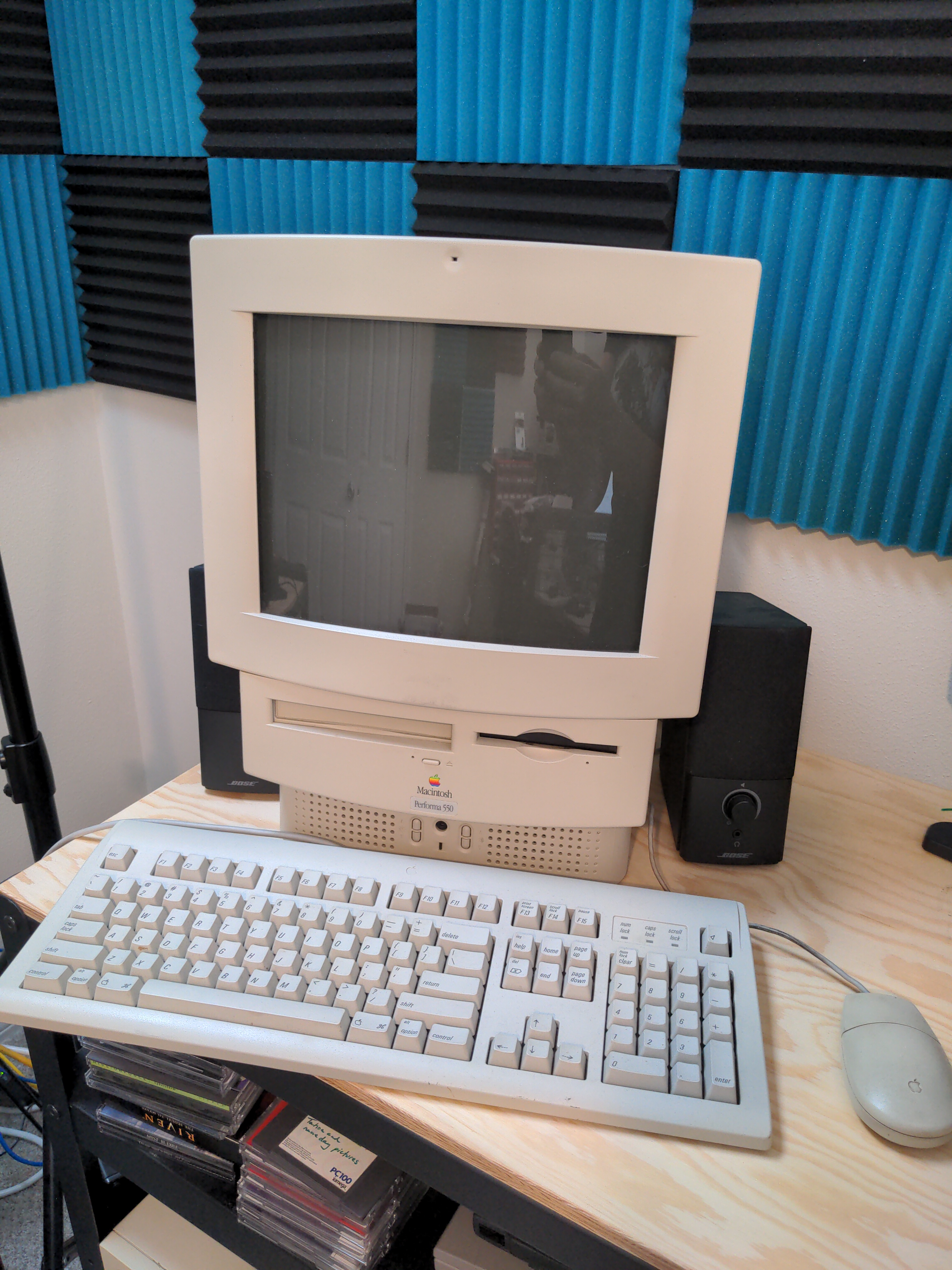
- A Macintosh Performa 550
- Also known as: "Hook 33"
- Developer: Apple Computer
- Product family: LC, Performa
- Released: October 18, 1993
- Introductory price: US$1,200 (equivalent to $2,674 in 2025)
- Discontinued: March 23, 1995
- Operating system: System 7.1 - Mac OS 7.6.1; With 68040 upgrade, Mac OS 8.1
- CPU: Motorola 68030 @ 33 MHz
- Memory: 5 MB, expandable to 36 MB (80 ns 72-pin SIMM)
- Display: 14 inches (36 cm)
- Dimensions: Height: 17.9 inches (45 cm); Width: 13.5 inches (34 cm); Depth: 16.5 inches (42 cm)
- Weight: 40.5 pounds (18.4 kg)
- Predecessor: Macintosh LC 520
- Successor: Macintosh LC 580; Power Macintosh 5200 LC

The Macintosh LC 550 replaced the LC 520 in February 1994. The Performa variants were introduced earlier, the 550 in October 1993 and the 560 in January 1994, and remained available for more than a year longer, until April 1996.

The main difference between the 550 and the 520 is the faster 68030 CPU, clocked at 33 MHz instead of 25 MHz, with the bus speed also increasing from 25 to 33 MHz. Unlike the 520, the optical drive was a bare-CD tray-loading type which did not require a caddy. The logic board in the 550 is essentially the same one used in the Macintosh Color Classic II, an upgrade to the original Color Classic not available in the United States. Apple also offered the same upgrade package for the 520 to the LC 575 logic board.

Two Performa variants were introduced, varying only in the software bundle that was included. The 550 included only consumer applications. The Performa 560 was called the "Money Edition" owing to a partnership between Apple and Money magazine. In addition to some consumer and educational software, it also included more than a dozen business software applications.

=== Models ===
Introduced October 18, 1993:

- Macintosh Performa 550: 160 MB HDD. Recovery partition on units that shipped with System 7.1P6.

Introduced January 15, 1994:

- Macintosh Performa 560 Money Edition: The Performa 550 with bundled business software. Sold only in the United States through Circuit City locations and direct order from Apple. US$2,199.

Introduced February 2, 1994:

- Macintosh LC 550

== LC 575 ==
Macintosh LC 575 Macintosh Performa 575/577/578
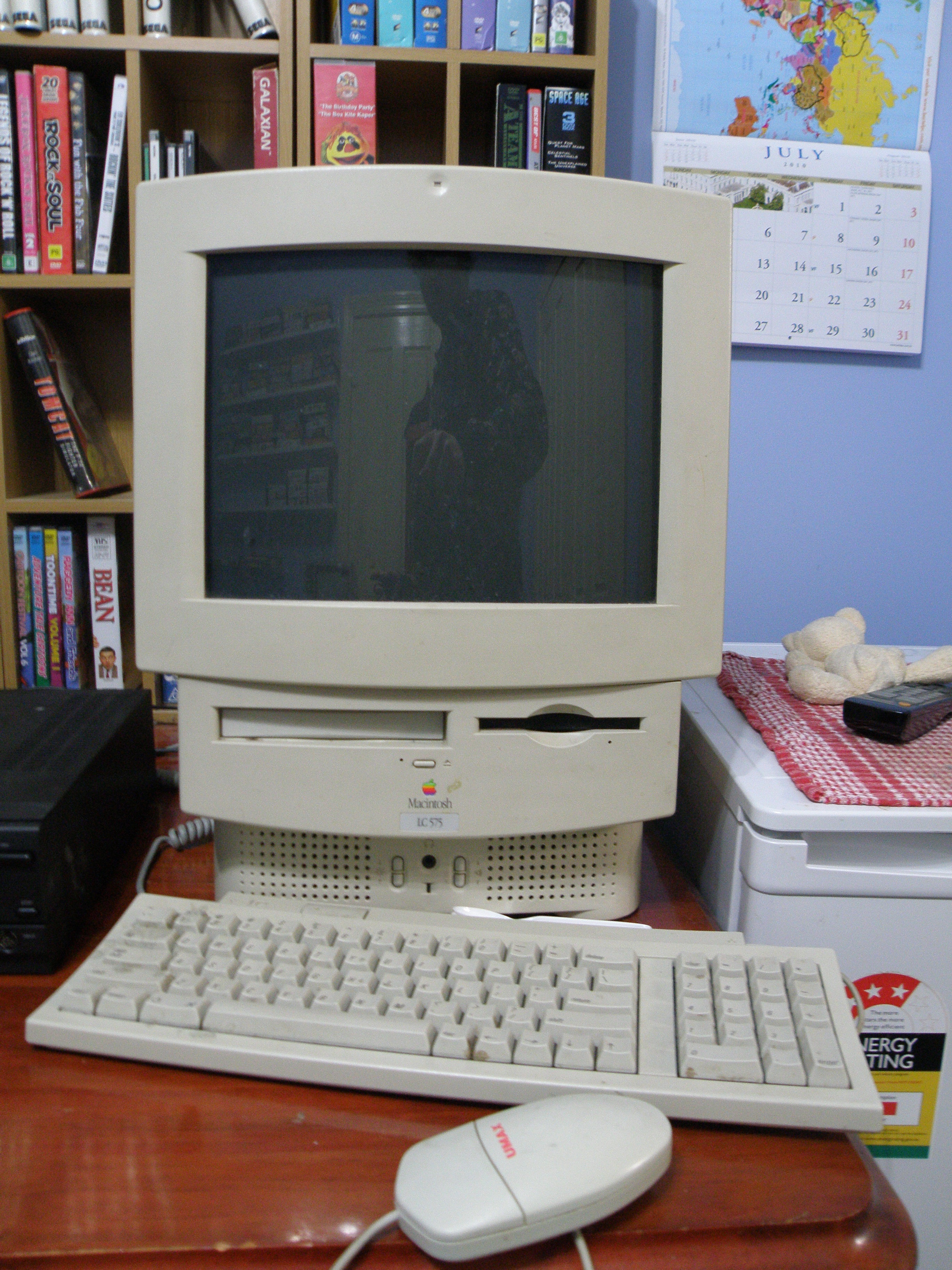
- A Macintosh LC 575 with non-original mouse
- Also known as: "Optimus"
- Developer: Apple Computer
- Product family: LC, Performa
- Released: February 1, 1994
- Introductory price: US$1,699 (equivalent to $3,691 in 2025)
- Discontinued: April 1, 1996
- Operating system: 7.1 - Mac OS 8.1; With PowerPC upgrade, Mac OS 9.1
- CPU: Motorola 68LC040 @ 33 MHz
- Memory: 5 MB, expandable to 68 MB (80 ns 72-pin SIMM)
- Display: 14 inches (36 cm)
- Dimensions: Height: 17.9 inches (45 cm); Width: 13.5 inches (34 cm); Depth: 16.5 inches (42 cm)
- Weight: 40.5 pounds (18.4 kg)
- Predecessor: Macintosh LC 550
- Successor: Macintosh LC 580; Power Macintosh 5200 LC

The Macintosh LC 575 was available from 1994 to 1996. It retains the "all-in-one" case of the LC 520/550, but uses the LC 475's architecture with a Motorola 68LC040 CPU (at a speed of 33 MHz instead of 25 MHz) and a tray-loading optical drive. It also included a high density floppy disk drive. The CPU clock is sometimes given as 66 MHz, since the clock signal is of that frequency - however, the processor itself only runs at 33 MHz. The LC 575 also introduced the comm slot, which was included in most later LC models as well.

In May 1994, a set of Performa variants were introduced: the Performa 575, 577 and 578. The machines are identical except for the amount of RAM and the HDD size. Software packages included with the Performa variants include ClarisWorks 2.0, Quicken 4.0, Grolier's Encyclopedia, the 1993 The TIME Almanac, At Ease and some educational titles.

David Pogue described this machine as having been "enthusiastically received by Mac fans, who appreciated their crisp color screens, speedy performance, rich sound, and upgradability to Power Macs down the line."

The LC variant was succeeded by the Macintosh LC 580 on the lower end or the PowerPC-based Power Macintosh 5200 LC models at the higher end. The Performa variants were sold until the 580 was discontinued.

This model is a favorite motherboard donor for those wishing to upgrade the Color Classic to a faster class of processor. Apple also offered an upgrade path in the form of a PowerPC Macintosh Processor Upgrade.

=== Models ===
Introduced February 1, 1994:

- Macintosh Performa 575: 5 MB RAM, 250 MB HDD.
- Macintosh Performa 577
- Macintosh Performa 578: the Performa 577 with 8 MB of RAM and 320 MB HDD.

Introduced November 3, 1994:

- Macintosh LC 575: 5 MB RAM, 160 MB HDD, CD-ROM. US$1,699. Sold only in the education market. An additional model with 8 MB RAM was available for volume purchase.

=== Hardware ===
- CPU: Motorola 68LC040 at 33 MHz
- RAM: 5 MB (expandable to 68 MB with 1 72-pin SIMM)
- Hard drive: SCSI, 160 MB (LC 575) / 250 MB (Performa 575) / 320 MB (Performa 577, Performa 578)
- VRAM: 512 KB (640×480 8-bit) (expandable to 1 MB (640×480 16-bit) using 1 80 ns VRAM SIMM)
- Floppy drive: 1.44 MB (can read 400 KB and 800 KB diskettes as well)
- Optical drive: 2x CD-ROM
- ROM Size: 1 MB
- Level 1 Cache: 8 KB
- Expansion: 1 LC PDS, 1 comm slot
- Built-in Display: 14" Sony Trinitron Color CRT (supporting up to 65,536 colors)

== LC 580 ==
Macintosh LC 580 Macintosh Performa 580CD/588CD
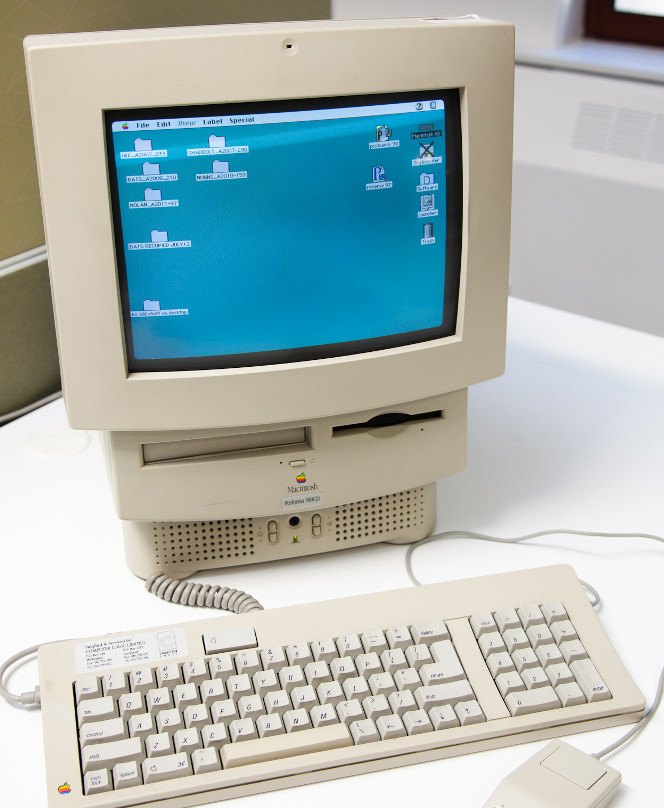
- A Macintosh Performa 580CD
- Also known as: "Dragonkid"
- Developer: Apple Computer
- Product family: LC, Performa
- Released: April 3, 1995
- Introductory price: US$1,300 (equivalent to $2,747 in 2025)
- Discontinued: May 1, 1996
- Operating system: System 7.1.2P - 7.5.1, 7.5.3 to Mac OS 8.1; With PowerPC upgrade, Mac OS 9.1
- CPU: Motorola 68LC040 @ 33 MHz
- Memory: 8 MB, expandable to 68 MB (80 ns 72-pin SIMM)
- Display: 14 inches (36 cm)
- Dimensions: Height: 17.9 inches (45 cm); Width: 13.5 inches (34 cm); Depth: 16.5 inches (42 cm)
- Weight: 40.5 pounds (18.4 kg)
- Predecessor: Macintosh LC 575
- Successor: Power Macintosh 5200 LC

The Macintosh LC 580 was sold from April 1995 to May 1996. Like the LC 575, it is built around a Motorola 68LC040 processor, running at 33 MHz. However, instead of using the same sized, SCSI-only, logic boards based on the LC 475/Quadra 605 like the LC 575, the 580 uses the larger logic board of the Performa 630. This meant a few changes, most of them leading to lower prices, but also lower performance: Most notably, the hard drives of the 580 were IDE drives instead of SCSI drives. Also, the video RAM was no longer mounted on a SIMM, but used 1 MB of the 4 MB of main RAM soldered to the motherboard. Lastly, the Trinitron display of the 575 was replaced with a cheaper shadow mask screen, causing a slight change in the plastic case surrounding the CRT. One benefit of this change was the ability to accommodate the same video capture and TV tuner cards designed for the Performa 630. This allowed LC 580 users to watch and record video, essentially performing the function of a television as well as a computer.

The LC 580 and LC 630 DOS Compatible, which were introduced at the same time, were the last of the Macintosh desktop systems to be built around a Motorola 68000-series processor. Its replacement, the Power Macintosh 5200 LC, features a PowerPC processor. Apple also offered an upgrade path for the 580 in the form of a PowerPC Macintosh Processor Upgrade. The 580 can also be upgraded with the following logic boards: 5200 LC, 6200, 5260, 5300, 6300, 5400, 6400, 5500 and 6500.

The LC 580's Performa variants were only available outside of the United States.

=== Models ===
Introduced April 3, 1995:

- Macintosh LC 580: 8 MB RAM, 500 MB HDD, sold only in the education market.

Introduced April 13, 1995:

- Macintosh Performa 588CD: a Performa 580CD with a 500 MB hard drive, sold only in Asia and Europe

Introduced May 1, 1995:

- Macintosh Performa 580CD: Sold in Canada, Asia, Australia and New Zealand

=== Hardware ===
Central processing unit: Motorola 68LC040 at 33 MHz; 8 KB of L1 cache

Memory: 8 MB, expandable to 52 MB with two 72-pin SIMMs. 1 MB of the 4 MB RAM soldered on the mainboard is used as video RAM.

Storage: Hard drive is 250 MB or 500 MB IDE; floppy drive is a 1.44 MB SuperDrive (can read 400 KB and 800 KB diskettes as well); CD-ROM is a 4x AppleCD unit.

Expansion: 1 LC PDS, 1 comm slot

Display: 14″ color CRT (supporting up to 65,536 colors)

== Technical specifications ==
According to Apple, all of these models are obsolete. (Note: Apple products that have been discontinued for 7 years and no longer receive hardware support or spare parts)

Model	Family	520		550			575				580		
Model	Model	LC 520	Performa 520	Performa 550	Performa 560	LC 550	Performa 575	Performa 577	Performa 578	LC 575	LC 580	Performa 588CD	Performa 580CD
Timetable	Released	June 28, 1993		October 18, 1993	January 15, 1994	February 2, 1994	February 1, 1994			November 3, 1994	April 3, 1995	April 13, 1995	May 1, 1995
Timetable	Discontinued	February 2, 1994		April 1, 1996		March 23, 1995	April 1, 1996			April 3, 1995	August 1, 1995	May 1, 1996	February 1, 1996
Model	Model number	M1640									M3872		
Model	Order number	M1778 (5/80); M1626 (8/80); M1627 (8/160)		M2147	M3327	?	M3119	M3201	M3202	M2618/B (4/160), M2461/B (5/160), M1797/B (8/160)	?	M4059J	M3872
Performance	Processor	68030 with optional 68882 (FPU)					68LC040						
Performance	Clock speed and bus	25 MHz		33 MHz									
Performance	Cache	0.5 kB L1					8 kB L1						
Performance	Memory	5 MB							8 MB	5 MB or 8 MB	8 MB		5 MB or 8 MB
Performance	Memory	72-pin 80 ns SIMM											
Performance	Memory	Expandable to 36 MB									Expandable to 52 MB		
Performance	Graphics	512 kB VRAM SIMM									1 MB VRAM SIMM		
Performance	Graphics	Expandable to 768 kB					Expandable to 1 MB				Not expandable		
Storage	Floppy drive	Floppy drive											
Storage	Hard drive	80 or 160 MB SCSI		160 MB SCSI		80 or 160 MB SCSI	250 MB SCSI	320 MB SCSI		160 or 320 MB SCSI	500 MB IDE		250 or 500 MB IDE
Storage	Optical drive	2x CD-ROM											
Connectivity		LC PDS slot					LC PDS slot 14.4k modem			LC PDS slot 14.4k modem Comm slot	LC PDS slot Comm slot Video I/O slot		
Video		14" Sony Trinitron RGB (supports resolutions up to 640x480)									14" generic CRT RGB (supports resolutions up to 640x480)		
Dimensions	Weight	40.5 lb (18.4 kg)											
Dimensions	Volume	17.9 in × 13.5 in × 16.5 in (450 mm × 340 mm × 420 mm)											
Operating system	Minimum	System 7.1									System 7.5		
Operating system	Latest release	Mac OS 7.6.1					Mac OS 8.1						

== Timeline ==
Timeline of Macintosh Centris, LC, Performa, and Quadra models, colored by CPU type

See also: List of Mac models
