= Macintosh Quadra 605 =

Personal computer by Apple Computer

Macintosh Quadra 605 / LC 475 / Performa 475/476
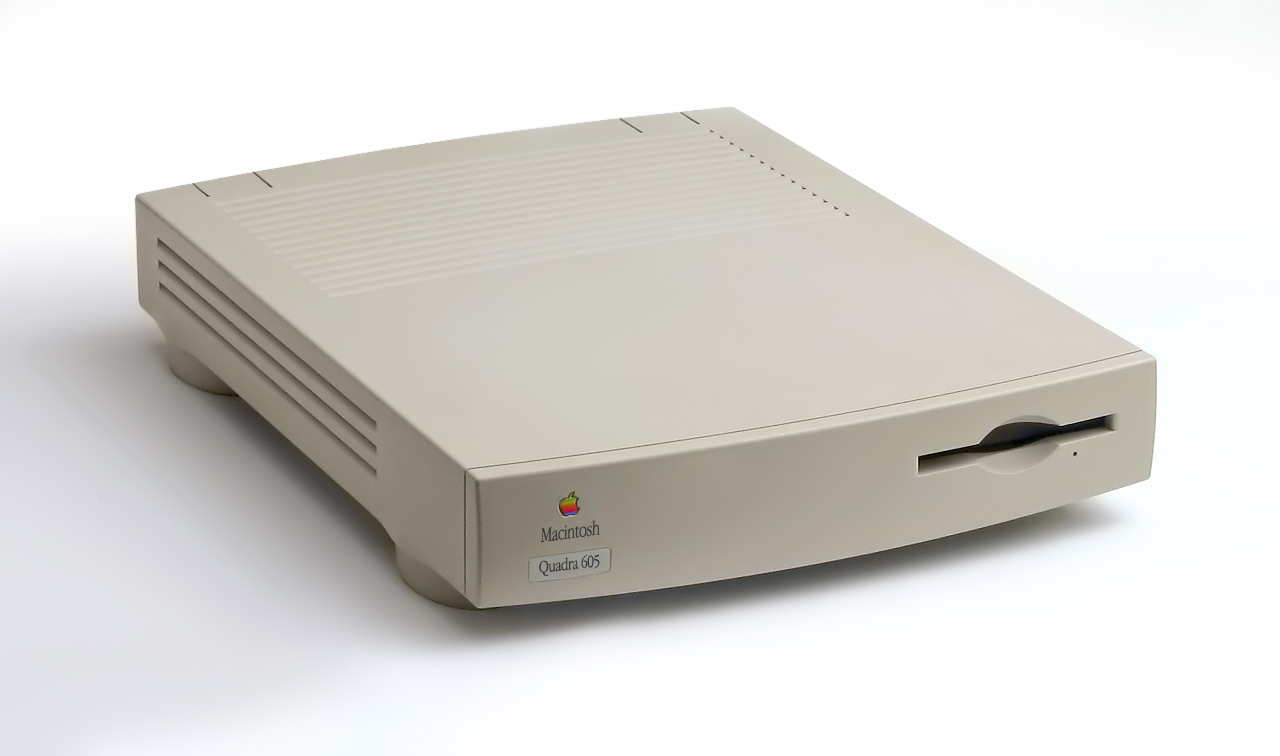
- A Macintosh Quadra 605
- Also known as: "Aladdin", "Primus"
- Developer: Apple Computer, Inc.
- Product family: Quadra, LC, Performa
- Released: October 18, 1993
- Introductory price: US$1,000 (equivalent to $2,230 in 2025)
- Discontinued: Quadra: October 17, 1994; Performa: April 1, 1996; LC: July 15, 1996
- Operating system: System 7.1 – Mac OS 8.1
- CPU: Motorola 68LC040 @ 25 MHz
- Memory: 4 MB (80 ns 72-pin SIMM)
- Dimensions: 2.9 × 12.2 × 15.3 in (74 × 310 × 389 mm)
- Weight: 8.8 lb (4.0 kg)
- Predecessor: Macintosh LC III
- Successor: Macintosh LC 520

The Macintosh Quadra 605 (also sold as the LC 475, Performa 475, and Performa 476) is a personal computer designed, manufactured, and sold by Apple Computer from October 1993 to July 1996. The model names reflect a decision made at Apple in 1993 to follow an emerging industry trend of naming product families for their target customers – Quadra for business, LC for education, and Performa for home. Accordingly, the Performa 475 and 476 were sold in department stores and electronics stores such as Circuit City, whereas the Quadra was only sold through authorized Apple resellers.

When introduced, the Quadra 605 was the least expensive new computer in Apple's lineup. (The Performa 410, introduced at the same time, at the same price of about US$1,000, but included a monitor, was based on the much older Macintosh LC II with a 16 MHz 68030 processor.) While all three computers used the pizza box form factor, the Performa 475/476 and LC 475 models reused the LC-series case, while the Quadra 605 had a slightly different design with four feet allowing it to sit flat on a desk, and no case screw.

The Quadra 605 was discontinued in October 1994, and the LC 475 variant continued to be sold to schools until July 1996. Apple offered no direct replacement for these machines, making it the final Macintosh to use the LC's lightweight slim-line form factor. Apple would not release another desktop computer under 10 pounds (4.5 kg) until the Mac Mini, nearly ten years later.

== Models ==
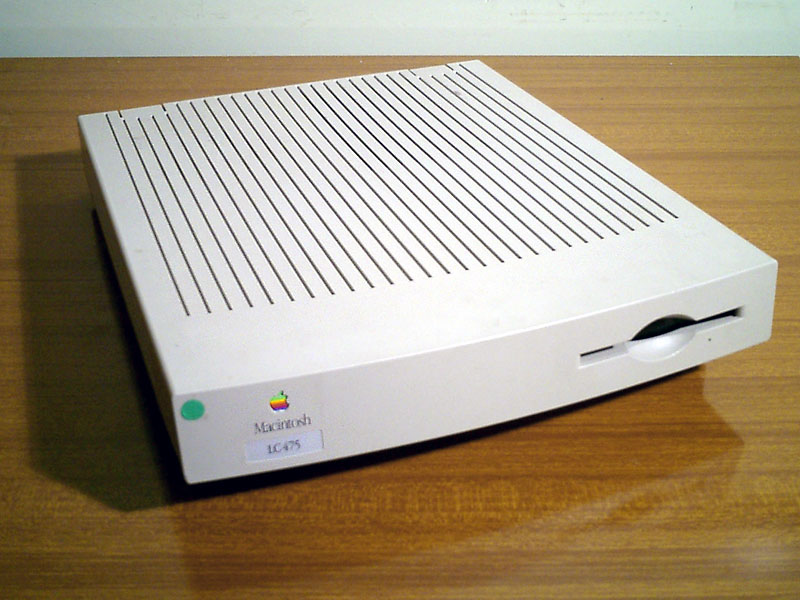
Macintosh LC 475, which like the Performa models, reused the LC case design.

All models come standard with a Motorola 68LC040 CPU running at 25 MHz, 4 MB RAM on board, 512 KB of VRAM (expandable to 1 MB), 1 LC III-style Processor Direct Slot, 1 ADB and 2 serial ports, external SCSI port, and a manual-inject floppy drive.

- Macintosh Quadra 605: 80 MB hard drive. Slightly different case design. Not available in Europe.
- Macintosh LC 475: 80 MB hard drive. Education market only. Optionally bundled with Apple Macintosh Color Display.
- Macintosh Performa 475: 160 MB hard drive. Bundled with Apple Color Plus 14" Display.
- Macintosh Performa 476: 230 MB hard drive. Bundled with Apple Color Plus 14" Display.

== Hardware ==
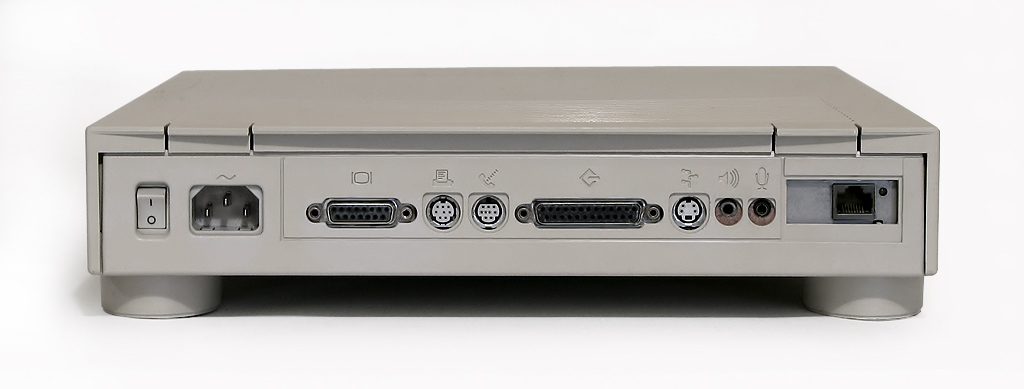
Quadra 605, rear. Includes Ethernet card.

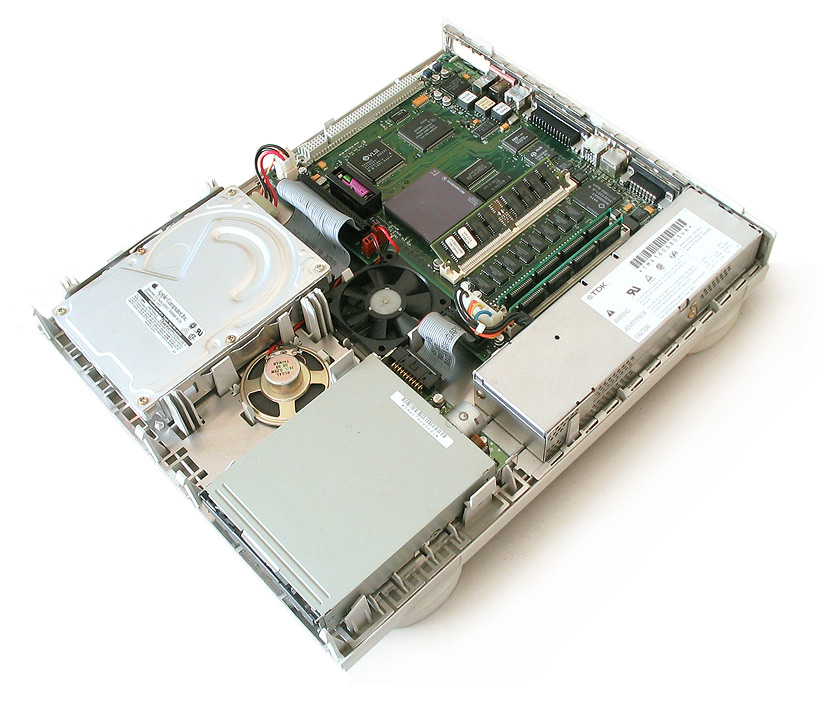
Quadra 605, inside

Central processing unit: 25 MHz MC68LC040, 32-bit bus. 8 KB of on-chip L1 cache is divided into 4 KB of data and 4 KB of instruction cache. Third-party cache cards can be installed in the CPU socket to provide a L2 cache. The 68LC040 can be replaced with a 68040 which includes onboard Floating Point Unit. This will approximately triple the speed of floating point operations.

RAM: 4 MB on the motherboard, one 72-pin SIMM socket for 80 ns or faster SIMMs. The official supported maximum RAM is 36 MB in one 32 MB 72-pin SIMM plus 4 MB on the motherboard, but larger SIMMs do work—up to 128 MB may be used, with some limits on RAM type. Physical limits might apply if the side of the SIMM facing the CPU has thicker chips, as the clips on the SIMM socket will not close around it automatically. It should be possible to manually push the clips enough to hold the SIMM in place. The DJMEMC memory controller used in the Quadra 605's predecessors (Quadra/Centris 610, Quadra/Centris 650 and Quadra 800) will only recognize SIMMs up to 32 MB, while the newer MEMCjr used in the Quadra 605 recognizes the larger sizes.

Video: Video out is provided by one DA-15 connector, and is compatible with VGA monitors through the use of an adaptor. Two internal Video RAM slots can take either two 256 KB 80 ns 68-pin VRAM SIMMs, or two 512 KB SIMMs. Installing one 512 KB and one 256 KB VRAM SIMM garbles the display. Resolutions and colors available with the two VRAM configurations are shown in the table below:

	512 KB	1024 KB
512×384	Thousands	Thousands
640×480	256	Thousands
640×870	16	256
832×624	256	Thousands
1024×768	16	256
1152×870	16	256

Audio:

- Out: stereo 8-bit, 11 kHz or 22 kHz; this is the first Macintosh LC model to support stereo output
- In: Line-level. The input socket is a stereo socket, and can input two channels of a stereo signal—however, these are mixed and only accessible to the hardware as a combined mono 8-bit signal. An Apple PlainTalk Microphone provides line-level input by using a longer 4-contact plug which receives power from a 5 V supply within the input jack. Other microphones only give a mic-level input, and do not work with the Quadra 605.

Recording is possible at 11,025 or 22,050 samples/second, with filters applied at 3.5 kHz and 7 kHz, respectively, while recording.

Floppy Drive: 1.4 MB SuperDrive, manual-inject.

Hard Drive: 80 MB, 160 MB or 230 MB SCSI hard drive, depending on model.

Battery: Quadra 605s take a lithium half-AA cell 3.6 V battery. If the battery is drained, the video will not start up. To start up a Quadra 605 with a flat or missing battery, it can be turned on for a few seconds, then turned off for a second then on again. This leaves enough charge in the system's capacitors for video to start up.

Power supply: 30 watts standard, but many second-hand machines come with replacement PSUs, either third-party, Apple replacement, or stripped from earlier LC models. Some of these go up to 45 watts. The Quadra 605 is a registered Energy Star-Compliant product.

Weight: 8.8 lb / 4 kg standard. A Quadra 605 can support a monitor up to 35 lb / 15.9 kg.

Dimensions: 2.9" high × 12.2" wide × 15.3" deep / 7.4 cm high × 31 cm wide × 38.8 cm deep.

== Expansion ==
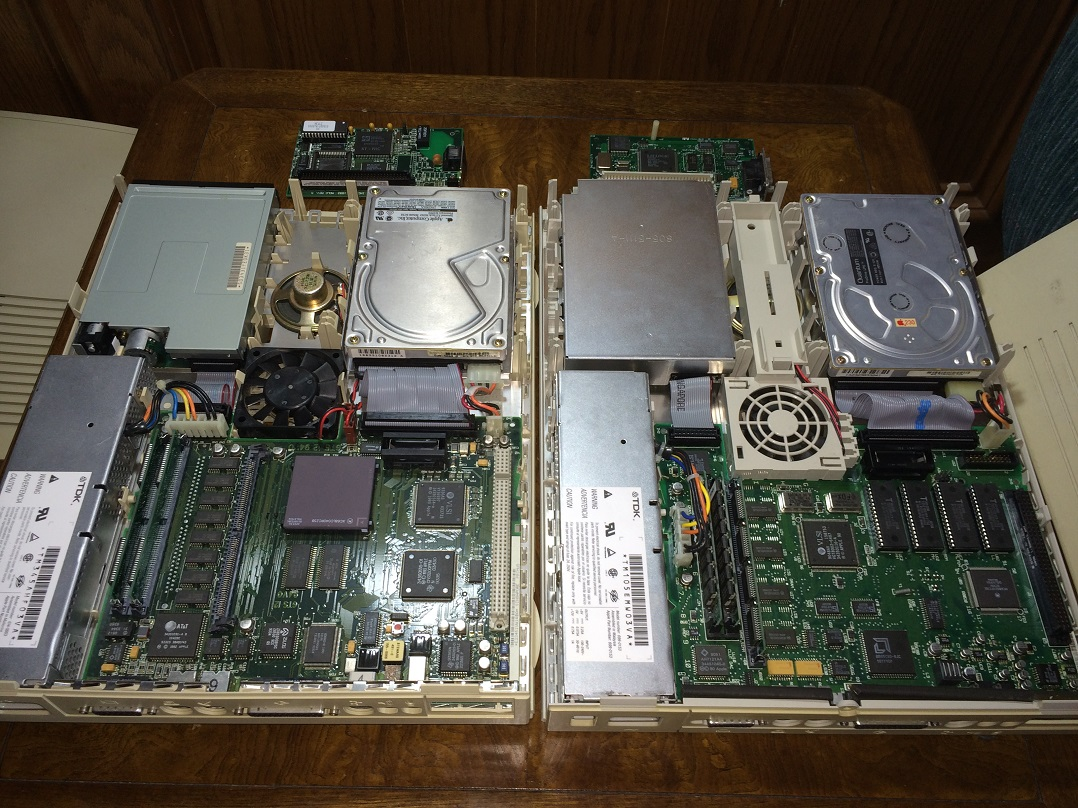
Quadra 605, left, compared to LC on right

The Quadra 605 contains one LC III-style 68030-compatible LC Processor Direct Slot. While this is mechanically compatible with previous models' LC PDS (it will take 96-pin or 114-pin LC PDS slot cards) it is not a true LC PDS, but emulates the previous machine's 68030 slot. Due to the success of the LC PDS in earlier Macs and with many expansion options already manufactured, Apple kept the same slot type in these 68040 machines. While the Quadra 605's LC PDS is mostly 68030-compatible, expansion cards made specifically for '030 processors, such as 68881 or 68882 FPUs, will not work. In addition it can utilize the Apple IIe Card, which allows the 605 to emulate an Apple IIe.

The Quadra 605 has one SCSI bus, with a 50-pin internal connector (with space for one low-profile 3.5" SCSI device) and one 25-pin DB25F external connector. SCSI is provided by an NCR 53C96 controller, which can achieve 6 MB/s internally with a fast enough drive, or 4 MB/s externally.

Two serial ports are provided on a Quadra 605; one 8-pin Mini-DIN printer port and one 9-pin Mini-DIN modem port similar to the printer port, but with an extra pin to supply +5 V power from the ADB power supply. Apple recommends no more than 100 mA should be drawn from this pin.

The Quadra 605, like most other Macintoshes manufactured before 1999, includes an Apple Desktop Bus port for use with a keyboard and mouse or other low-speed, low-power peripherals.

Some earlier models also contain a ROM SIMM socket, located just to the left of the VRAM. No SIMMs were made for this slot, and most boards only contain the solder pads indicating its position. The ROMs as used in production machines are two surface mount chips located directly behind the CPU. Quadra 605s use a 1024 KB ROM, version 7C.

=== PowerPC upgrades ===
The Quadra 605 was compatible with Apple's Macintosh Processor Upgrade Card which provided a 50 MHz PowerPC 601 CPU. DayStar Digital and Sonnet manufactured 100 MHz versions of this card which could also be used in the Quadra 605.

These upgrade cards plug directly into the 68040 socket, but when fitted cover the LC PDS expansion slot, making this slot unavailable for other expansion cards.

== Miscellaneous ==
Some Quadra 605s have a Cuda reset switch which is used to manually reset the PRAM, located towards the rear of the motherboard just to the front of the audio out port and labeled "S1". Others do not include this switch, instead having two solder pads within a silkscreened square.

The keyboard power-on key will not start up a Quadra 605 as there is no soft power-on. Only the rocker switch at the back will turn a Quadra 605 on or off. Pressing the power-on key while booted is the same as selecting the Shut Down command in the Finder, and once a Quadra 605 has completed its shutdown process it will prompt the operator to manually switch it off.

Quadra 605s have no reset button or programmer's button, but key combinations can perform the same functions. To reset, users can hold down the Command, Control and Power keys. For a programmer's button click, users can hold down the Command and Power keys. There are some hard crash situations where even this is not enough to restore the system, in which case the power switch is the only recourse.

A modified Quadra 605 motherboard was used as the basis of early Apple Interactive Television Box prototypes. Later prototypes used their own board design, but still retained a resemblance to the 605.

=== Gestalt IDs ===
The standard Gestalt ID for a 25 MHz Quadra 605 is 94. The ID of the logic board that the Quadra 605 shares with other LC/Performa models depends on two things. Jumper J18 (located just behind the hard drive) will identify the computer as a Quadra 605 (ID 94 @ 25 MHz) if it is ON, and as an LC475/Performa 47x (ID 89 @ 25 MHz) if it is OFF. Over-clocking and under-clocking the motherboard also changes the Gestalt ID. A list of Gestalt IDs returned with various logic board modifications (speed as reported by Newer Technology's "Clockometer") are as follows

J18	Gestalt ID	Name	Speed
ON	93	20 MHz Quadra 605	19.93 MHz
ON	94	25 MHz Quadra 605	24.75 MHz
ON	95	33 MHz Quadra 605	32.89 MHz
OFF	86	20 MHz LC475	19.93 MHz
OFF	89	25 MHz LC475	24.75 MHz
OFF	90	33 MHz LC475	32.89 MHz

=== Overclocking ===
Overclocking the Quadra 605 family of machines has been historically popular, with many users undertaking a simple resistor mod to increase the computer's speed to 33 MHz from the standard 25 MHz, with higher speeds available by injecting an alternative clock source instead of the onboard clock.

In 2024 it was discovered that the onboard clock generator was actually directly programmable through software, allowing a range of speeds to be selected with no hardware modifications, often up to bus speeds of 40 MHz. Further speed and stability improvements can be made by moving the resistor which selects the SCSI chip's clock from the location which uses the bus frequency to the location that uses half the bus frequency, by replacing the CPU with a higher speed grade part, and by replacing the MC88920 chip (which produces a number of clock outputs for distribution around the logic board based on the input from the clock generator) with a compatible, higher speed grade, MC88916. Faster RAM, ROM and VRAM is only likely needed if attempting overclocks beyond 50 MHz as the software adds wait states to compensate for higher clock speeds.

As they use the same chipset, the software also works with the LC 575 family of all-in-one Macs.

== System software ==
A standard Quadra 605 is capable of running classic Mac OS versions 7.1, 7.1.1 (Pro), 7.5, 7.5.1, 7.5.3, 7.5.5, 7.6, 7.6.1, 8.0, and 8.1. With a PowerPC upgrade installed, it can run 8.5, 8.5.1, 8.6, 9.0, 9.0.1, 9.0.2, 9.0.3, 9.0.4 and 9.1. Versions of the System Software below 7.5 require the use of System Enabler 065. If a Quadra 605 is running a version of System 7.1, over-clocking it from the standard 25 MHz to 33 MHz will change the Gestalt ID, but the enabler will recognize the new ID. Under-clocking to 20 MHz, however, will change the Gestalt ID to one the enabler doesn't recognize as compatible, and the system won't boot. System 7.5 or later is not affected by this issue.

== Timeline ==
Timeline of Macintosh Centris, LC, Performa, and Quadra models, colored by CPU type

See also: List of Mac models
