= Macintosh LC family =

Family of lower-cost Macintosh computers by Apple, Inc

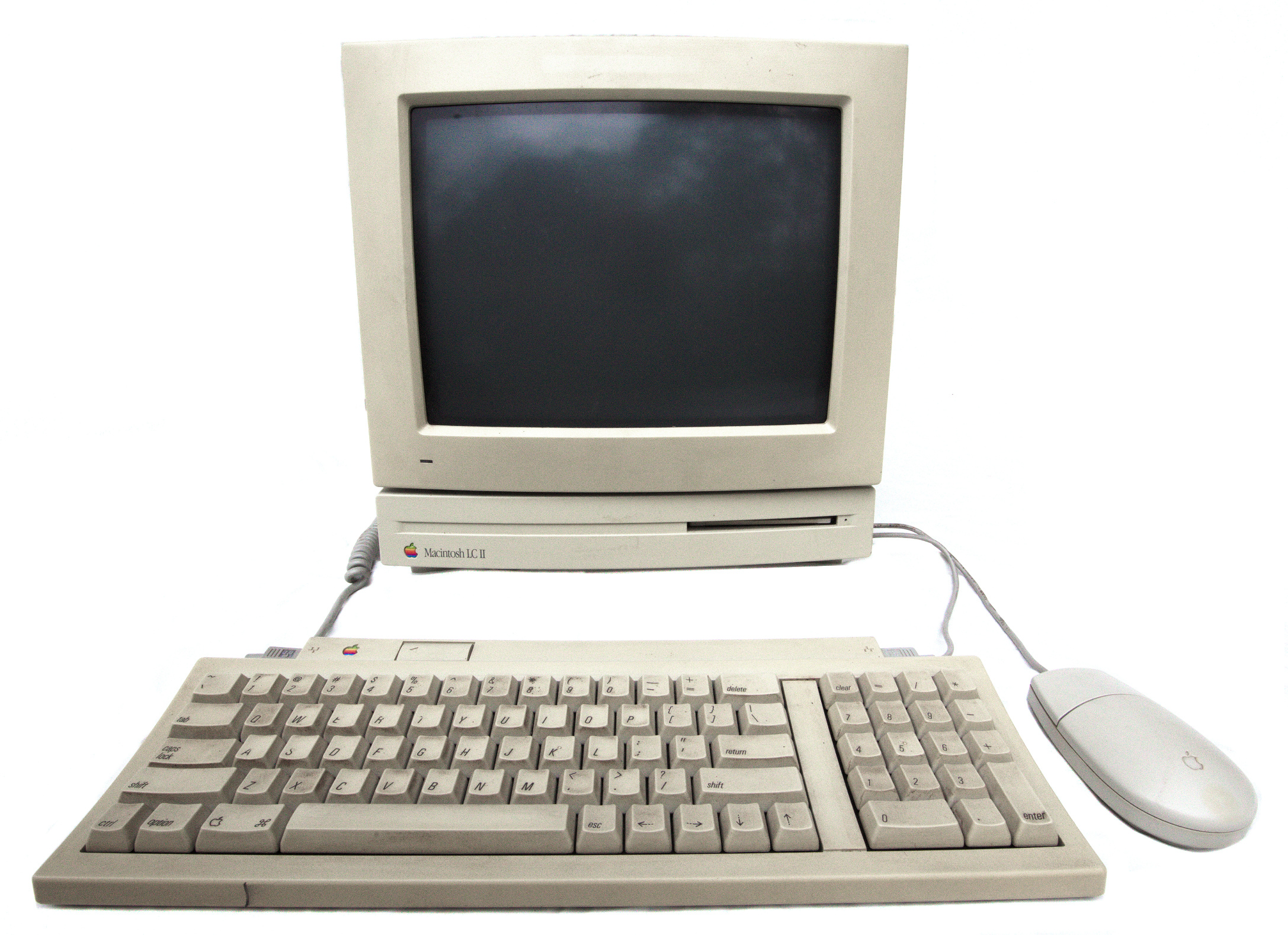
Front view of a Macintosh LC II with Macintosh 12" RGB display, keyboard, and mouse

The Macintosh LC is a family of personal computers designed, manufactured and sold by Apple Computer, Inc. from 1990 to 1997. The name stands for low-cost, and was positioned as the company's entry-level line, below the mid-range Centris models and high-end Quadra.

Introduced alongside the Macintosh IIsi and Macintosh Classic as part of a new wave of lower-priced Macintosh computers, the LC offered about three quarters of the overall performance of the Macintosh II for half the price. Part of Apple's goal was to produce a machine that could be sold to schools for the same price as an Apple IIGS. Not long after the Apple IIe Card was introduced for the LC, Apple officially announced the retirement of the IIGS, as the company wanted to focus its sales and marketing efforts on the LC.

The original Macintosh LC was introduced in October 1990, with updates in the form of the LC II and LC III in 1992 and early 1993. These early models all shared the same pizza box form factor, and were joined by the Macintosh LC 500 series of all-in-one desktop machines in mid-1993. A total of twelve different LC models were produced by the company, the last of which, the Power Macintosh 5300 LC, was on sale until early 1997.

== Overview ==
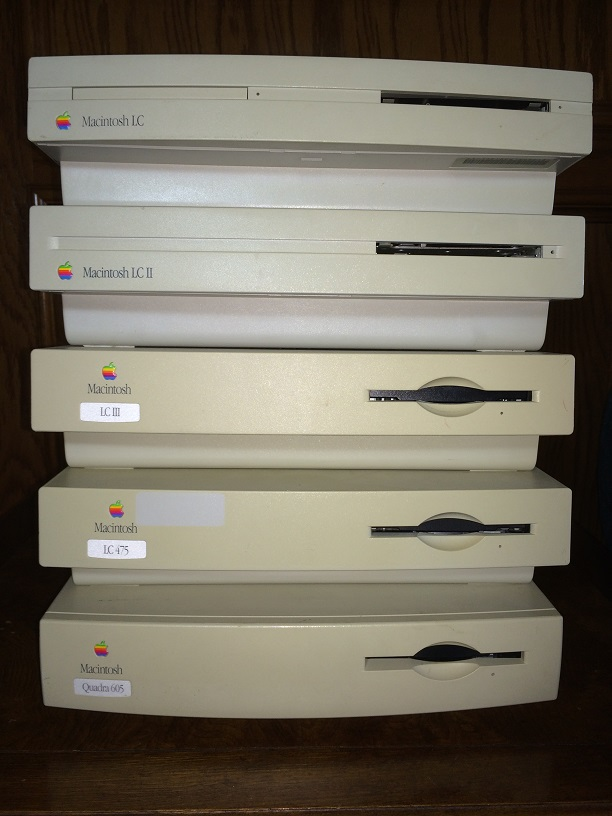
The LC family (LC, II, III, 475, Quadra 605) front face

After Apple co-founder Steve Jobs left Apple in 1985, product development was handed to Jean-Louis Gassée, formerly manager of Apple France. Gassée consistently pushed the Apple product line in two directions, towards more "openness" in terms of expandability and interoperability, and towards higher price. Gassée long argued that Apple should not market their computers towards the low end of the market, where profits were thin, but instead concentrate on the high end and higher profit margins. He illustrated the concept using a graph showing the price/performance ratio of computers with low-power, low-cost machines in the lower left and high-power high-cost machines in the upper right. The "high-right" goal became a mantra among the upper management, who said "fifty-five or die", referring to Gassée's goal of a 55 percent profit margin.

This policy led to a series of ever more expensive computers. This was in spite of strenuous objections within the company, and when a group at Claris started a low-end Mac project called "Drama", Gassée actively killed it. Elsewhere at the company, two engineers, H.L. Cheung and Paul Baker, had been working in secret on a pet project, a color Macintosh prototype they called "Spin". The idea was to produce a low-cost system in the vein of the Apple II, a product that Cheung had previously worked on at Apple as the head of design. The machine would, in effect, be a significantly smaller Macintosh II with built-in video, no NuBus expansion, and a matching RGB monitor similar to the one introduced with the Apple IIGS the year prior. The project changed direction during development, with executives dictating that the machine should have video capabilities and processing power similar to the Macintosh IIci, which was also under development at the time. In early 1989, the prototype was shown to Apple executives, who liked the project but felt it was not different enough from existing models to justify further effort, and the project was shut down.

Around the same time, Apple CEO John Sculley was facing public scrutiny for declining sales that was blamed in large part on the company's lack of an inexpensive Macintosh computer. Amidst promises to the press and investors that a new low-cost Macintosh was on the way, he revived the Spin project with the goal of creating the lowest-priced Macintosh that was possible. Gassée pleaded with the team to keep color as a feature of the project, and from then on the product was known internally by a new code name, "Elsie", a homonym for the "LC" (i.e. low-cost color) name the computer would later be sold as. Elsie prototypes at this point resembled an Apple IIc where the keyboard was integrated into the unit, and it had a single 800 KB floppy drive with no hard drive. The team ended up with a problem — the machine was cheap, but it wasn't a good computer, especially because the 68000 CPU was not powerful enough to display color graphics with acceptable performance.

By April 1989, it was decided to split the project into three computers—the Macintosh IIsi, which would have the more powerful 68030 CPU; the Macintosh Classic, which would use a black & white display, and the LC, which would use the 68020 CPU from the Macintosh II.

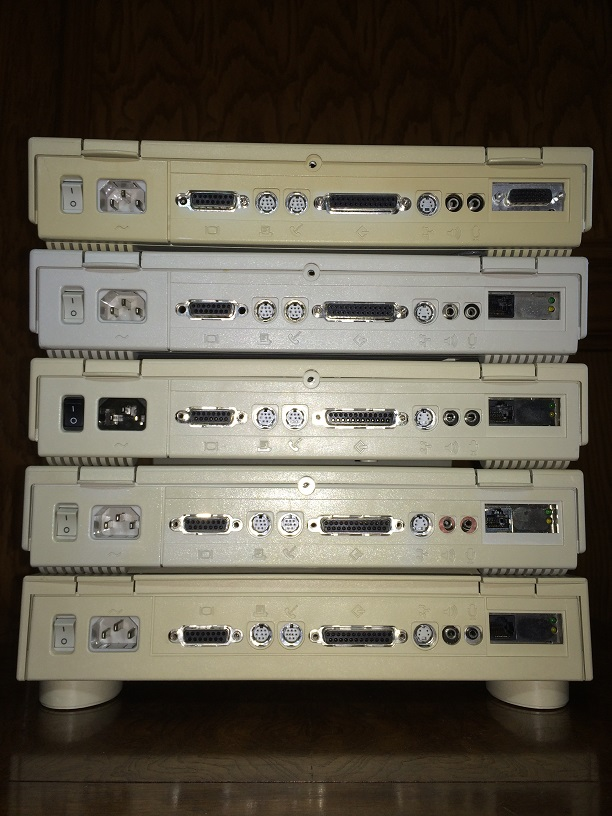
The LC family (LC, II, III, 475, Quadra 605) back face

To keep the price down, Apple cut some corners on performance and features, and redesigned components to be less expensive. For example, the external floppy connector that was included on the IIsi and Classic was excluded from the LC, as it would save a couple of dollars for the connector. The integrated keyboard had also been dropped by this point; it was replaced with a newly designed keyboard called the Apple Keyboard II.

=== Market ===
The Macintosh LC was introduced to the market alongside the Macintosh Classic (a repackaging of the older Macintosh Plus) and the Macintosh IIsi (a new entry-level machine for the Macintosh II series). Due to pent-up demand for a low-cost color Macintosh, the LC was a strong seller, and in 1992, the original Macintosh LC was succeeded by the LC II. The updated machine replaced the LC's Motorola 68020 processor with a 68030 and increased the soldered memory to 4 MB to make it more suitable for System 7. However, it retained the original LC's 16-bit system bus and 10 MB RAM limit (if 4 MB SIMMs was used, the extra 2 MB of RAM would be inaccessible), making its performance roughly the same as the earlier model. The main benefit of the 030 processor in the LC II was the ability to use System 7's virtual memory feature. In spite of this, the new model sold even better than the LC.

In early 1993, Apple introduced the LC III, which used a 25 MHz version of the 68030 and had a higher memory limit of 36 MB, instead of the 10 MB of the LC and LC II. The LC III spawned a whole series of LC models, most of which later were sold both with the LC name to the education world and to consumers via traditional Apple dealers, and as Performa to the consumer market via electronics stores, and department stores such as Sears. (For example, the LC 475 was also known as the Performa 475.) The last official "LC" was the Power Macintosh 5300/100 LC, which was released in August 1995 and discontinued in April 1996. The LC 580 was notable for being the last desktop 680x0-based Macintosh.

=== Expansion to all-in-one market ===
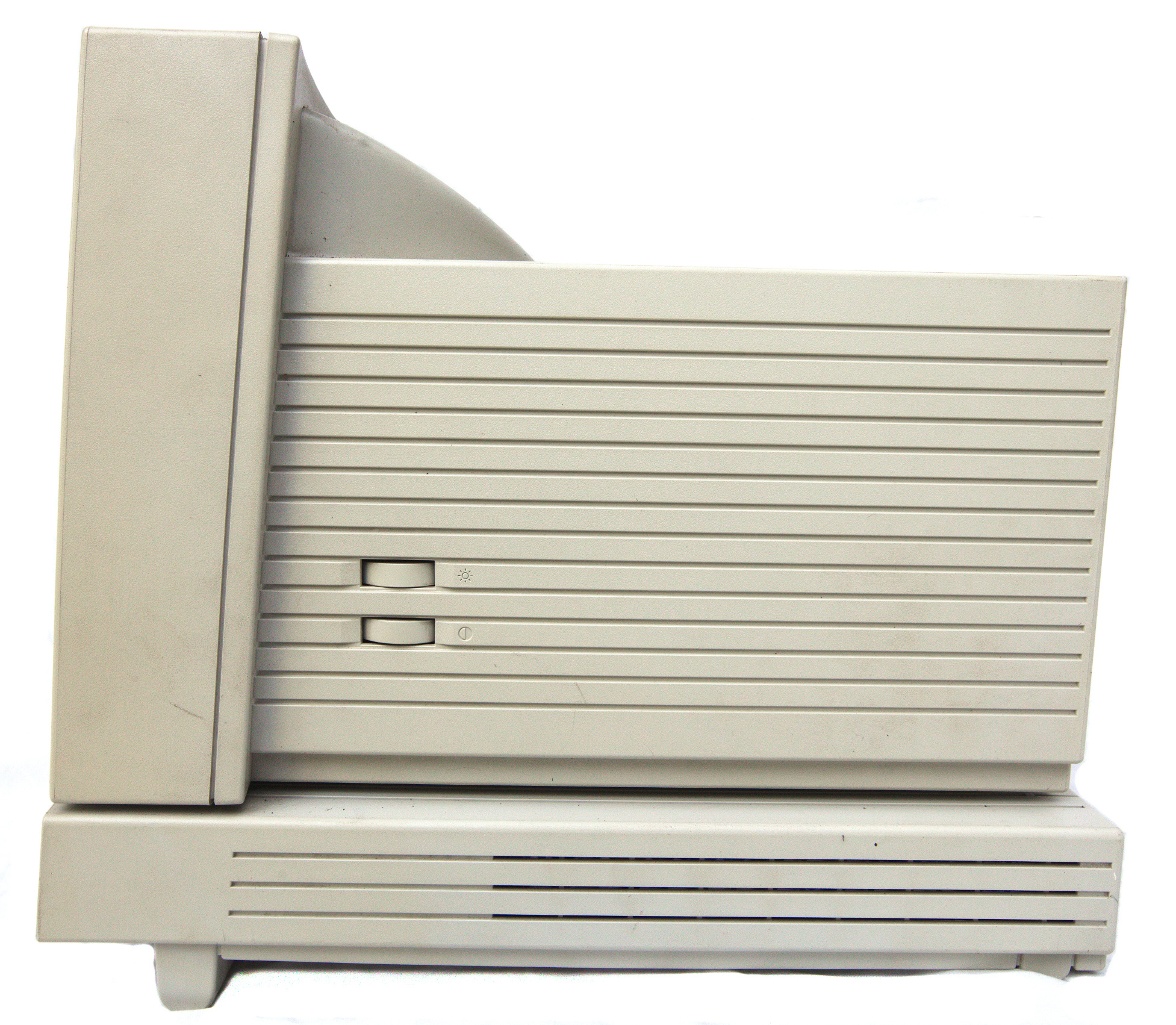
Side view of an LC II

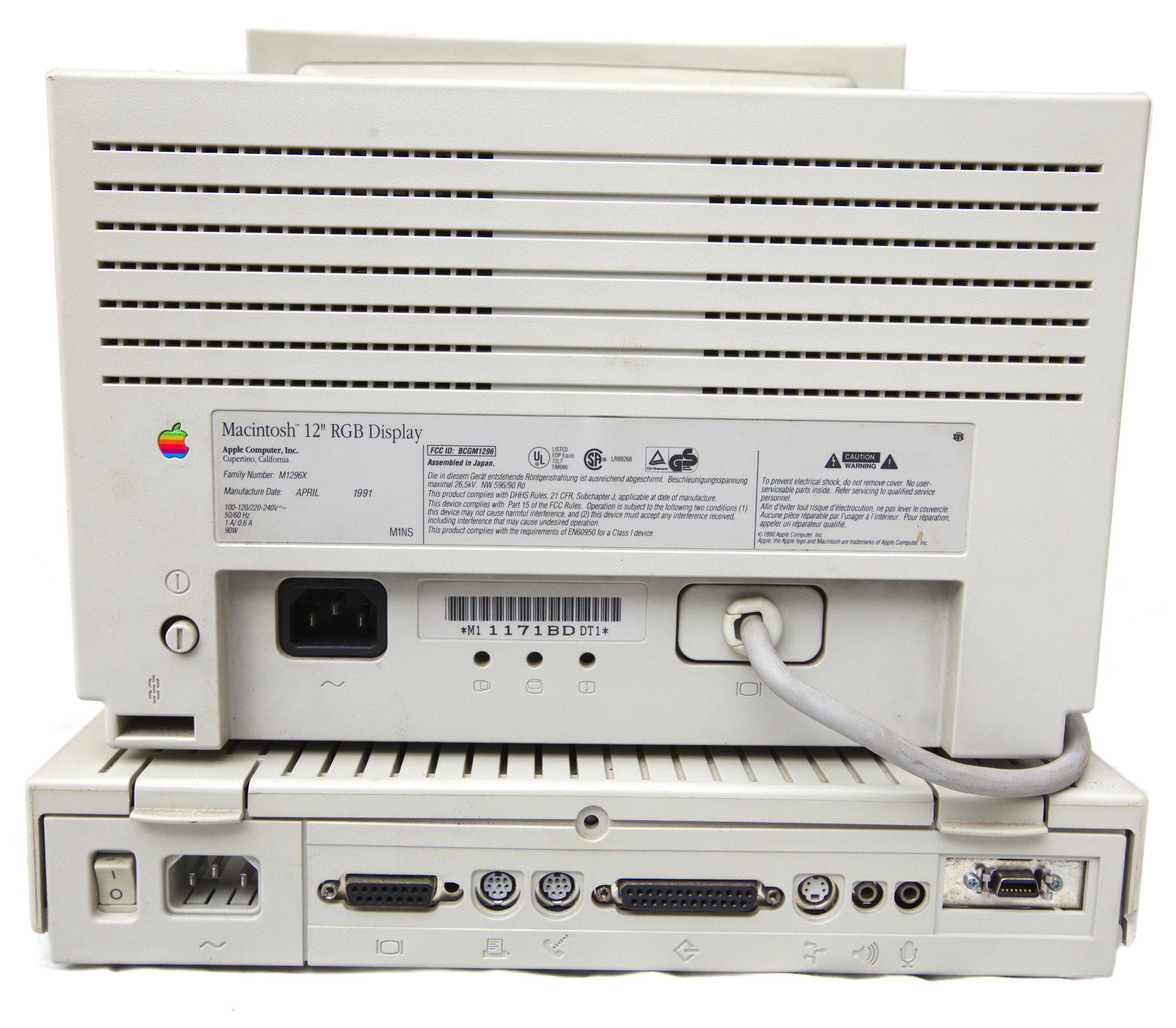
Rear view of an LC II

In mid-1993, Apple introduced the Macintosh LC 520, which combined the traditional all-in-one form factor popularized by the compact Macintosh family, with the technology platform of the LC III. It became Apple's mainstream education-market Macintosh, featuring a built-in 14" CRT display, CD-ROM drive, and stereo speakers. The case is similar to the recently introduced Macintosh Color Classic, but considerably larger and heavier due to its larger screen and a bulging midsection to house the larger electronics.

Four LC 500-series models were released over the next two years, the 520, 550, 575, and 580, with the 520 and 550 both using different speeds of the Motorola 68030, and the 575 and 580 sharing the 33 MHz Motorola 68LC040 processor but differing on the rest of the hardware. All of these computers were also sold to the consumer market through department stores under the Macintosh Performa brand, with similar model numbers. The LC models, in particular, became very popular in schools for their small footprint, lack of cable clutter, and durability. Apple also released the Macintosh TV, a variant of the LC/Performa 520 that, while not branded as an LC, uses a black-coloured version of the LC 520's case, a logic board similar to the LC 550 and a TV tuner card. The compact Color Classic series shares many components, and is able to swap logic boards, with the early 500 series machines.

The Power Macintosh 5200 LC was introduced in April 1995 with a PowerPC 603 CPU at 75 MHz as a PowerPC-based replacement of the LC 500 series. In August, the Power Macintosh 5300 LC was released which kept the same motherboard design but included a more powerful PowerPC 603e CPU, as well as a "Director's Edition" with similar design and features to the Macintosh TV. Unlike previous education models, which prepended the model number with "LC", the 5200 / 5300 models use the Power Macintosh designation of Apple's main workstation line of the time, with "LC" appended to the end.

The 5300 LC is the final model branded as an "LC" and was on sale until early 1997. Its replacement was the Power Macintosh 5500, which continued the practice of building education-specific models but without distinctive branding (except for the UK-only Power Macintosh ONE/225). The company did not produce another education model with its own brand name until the eMac in 2002.

== Models ==
=== Desktop ===
Model	Processor	Bundled Mac OS	Maximum Mac OS	Hard disk	RAM	Expansion	Video RAM	Equivalent	Released/Discontinued
LC	16 MHz 68020	6.0.6/6.0.7	7.5.5	30–80 MB	2 MB (max 10 MB)	LC PDS	256 KB (max 512 KB)	N/A	October 1990 / March 1992
LC II	16 MHz; 68030	7.0.1	7.6.1	30–80 MB	4 MB (max 10 MB)	LC PDS	256 KB (max 512 KB)	Performa 400–430	March 1992 / March 1993
LC III	25 MHz; 68030	7.1	7.6.1	80–160 MB	4 MB (max 36 MB)	LC III PDS	512 KB (max 768 KB)	Performa 450	February 1993 / February 1994
LC III+	33 MHz; 68030	7.1	7.6.1	80–160 MB	4 MB (max 36 MB)	LC III PDS	512 KB (max 768 KB)	Performa 460–467	October 1993 / February 1994
LC 475	25 MHz; 68LC040	7.1	8.1	80–250 MB	4 MB (max 36 MB)	LC III PDS	0.5-1 MB	Performa 475, Quadra 605	October 1993 / July 1996
LC 630	33 MHz; 68LC040	7.1.2 Pro	8.1	250–500 MB	4 MB (max 36 MB)	LC PDS/Comm/Video	1 MB	Quadra 630, Performa 630–640CD	July 1994 / October 1995

=== All-in-one ===
Model	Processor	Bundled Mac OS	Maximum Mac OS	Hard disk	RAM	Expansion	Video RAM	Equivalent	Released/Discontinued
LC 520	25 MHz; 68030	7.1	7.6.1	80–160 MB	4 MB (max 36 MB)	LC PDS	512–768 KB	Performa 520	June 1993 / February 1994
Macintosh TV	32 MHz; 68030	7.1	7.6.1	160 MB	4 MB (max 8 MB)	LC PDS (filled with TV card)	512 KB	Performa 520	October 1993 / February 1994
LC 550	33 MHz; 68030	7.1	7.6.1	80–160 MB	4 MB (max 36 MB)	LC PDS	512–768 KB	Performa 550–560	February 1994 / March 1995
LC 575	33 MHz; 68LC040	7.1	8.1	160–320 MB	4 MB (max 68 MB)	LC PDS/Comm slot	0.5-1 MB	Performa 575–578	February 1994 / April 1995
LC 580	33 MHz; 68LC040	7.1.2P	8.1	500 MB	4 MB (max 52 MB)	LC PDS/Comm slot/Video	1 MB	Performa 580CD–588CD	April 1995 / March 1996

== Timeline ==
Timeline of Macintosh Centris, LC, Performa, and Quadra models, colored by CPU type

See also: List of Mac models

== See also ==
- List of Mac models grouped by CPU type
- Timeline of Macintosh models
