= Macintosh Processor Upgrade Card =

CPU upgrade card

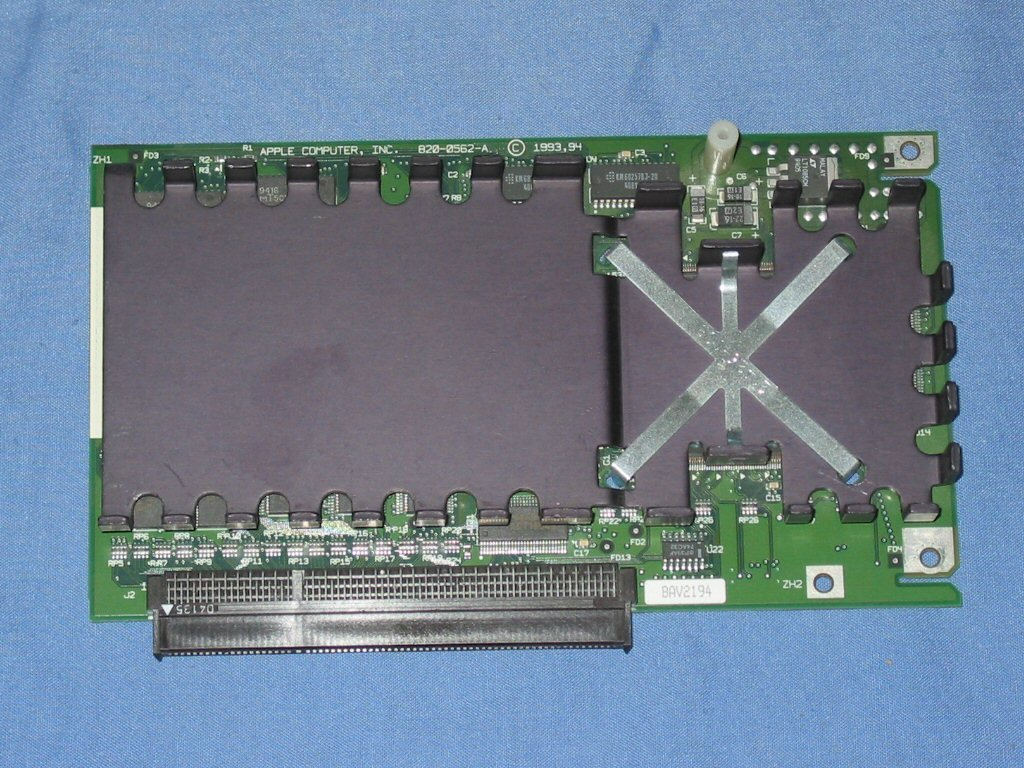
A Power Macintosh Upgrade Card.

The Macintosh Processor Upgrade Card (code named STP) is a central processing unit upgrade card sold by Apple Computer, designed for many Motorola 68040-powered Macintosh LC, Quadra and Performa models. The card contains a PowerPC 601 CPU and plugs into the 68040 CPU socket of the upgraded machine.

The Processor Upgrade card required the original CPU be plugged back into the card itself, and gave the machine the ability to run in its original 68040 configuration, or through the use of a software configuration utility allowed booting as a PowerPC 601 computer running at twice the original speed in MHz (50 MHz or 66 MHz) with 32 KB of L1 cache, 256 KB of L2 cache and a PowerPC Floating Point Unit available to software. The Macintosh Processor Upgrade requires and shipped with System 7.5.

Development of the card started in July 1993. The upgrade card was announced in January 1994 at the MacWorld Expo in San Francisco. Apple described the Macintosh Processor Upgrade Card as giving a performance increase of "two to four times" for general purposes, or "up to 10 times" for floating point intensive programs.

While the Macintosh Processor Upgrade did not plug into the LC Processor Direct Slot, due to power used and the space taken by the upgrade, LC PDS cards could not be fitted while the card was installed. This limited the usefulness of the Processor Upgrade Card, as internal Ethernet, Apple IIe compatibility, video cards and other LC PDS expansion options must be removed.

The Macintosh Processor Upgrade Card can bring a 68k Mac, that can normally only go up to Mac OS 8.1, to be upgraded to Mac OS 8.6 or newer as long as the card is always in use. If the user turns off or disconnect the card, the machine will display a Sad Mac as newer versions of Mac OS aren't compatible with 68k processors. The Macintosh Processor Upgrade Card can only run up to Mac OS 9.1 as 9.2 onwards require a G3 processor as a minimum.

DayStar Digital manufactured the Macintosh Processor Upgrade Card for Apple, sold the same card as their Daystar PowerCard 601-50/66 and also manufactured a Daystar PowerCard 601/100 which reached 100 MHz. After Daystar went out of business the 100 MHz model was manufactured and sold by Sonnet Technologies as their Sonnet Presto PPC 605.
