= Macintosh TV =

Computer/Television designed by Apple Inc

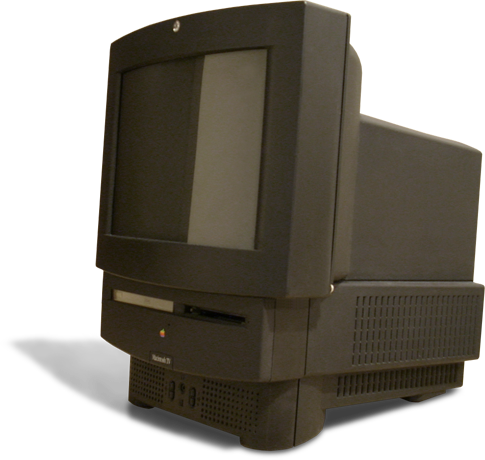
- Also known as: Mac TV; LD50; Peter Pan
- Type: All-in-one
- Released: October 25, 1993; 33 years ago
- Introductory price: US$2,097 (equivalent to $4,674 in 2025)
- Discontinued: February 1, 1995
- Units shipped: 10,000
- Operating system: System 7.1 - Mac OS 7.6.1; With 68040 upgrade, Mac OS 8.1, or with PowerPC upgrade, Mac OS 9.1
- CPU: Motorola 68030 @ 32 MHz
- Memory: 5 MB RAM (80 ns 72-pin SIMM), expandable to 8 MB, 1 MB ROM
- Storage: 160 MB HDD, 1.44 MB SuperDrive
- Display: Built-in 14" Sony Trinitron CRT
- Graphics: Video: 512 KB VRAM; supports 640 × 480 at 8-bits
- Dimensions: 17.9" × 13.5" × 16.5"
- Weight: 40.5 lb.
- Successor: Power Macintosh G3 All-in-One
- Website: support.apple.com/kb/SP217

The Macintosh TV is a personal computer with integrated television capabilities released by Apple Computer in 1993. It was Apple's first attempt at computer–television integration. It shares the external appearance of the Macintosh LC 500 series, but in black. The Macintosh TV is essentially a Performa 520 that can switch its built-in 14" Sony Trinitron CRT from being a computer display to a cable-ready television. It is incapable of showing television in a desktop window, although it can capture still frames to PICT files.

It comes with a small credit card-sized remote control that is also compatible with Sony televisions. It was the first Macintosh to be made in black and comes with a matching black keyboard and mouse. Later Apple would issue a custom black Performa 5420 in markets outside the United States with many of the features of the Mac TV. Apple's similar TV tuner card was a popular option for later LC, Performa series, and select models of Power Macintosh G3 beige computers.

Only 10,000 were made in the model's short time on the market.

== Specifications ==
The Macintosh TV is equipped with a 32 MHz Motorola 68030 CPU, a 16 MHz bus, and 5 MB of RAM (which can be expanded to 8 MB via a 4 MB SIMM). It also comes with a CD-ROM drive, ADB ports for connecting keyboard and mouse, DIN-8 serial ports, and a DB-25 SCSI interface. Additionally, it features an Antenna In (F-type RF Connector), Composite Video-In, Stereo Audio Input (RCA-type), and a 3.6 V lithium PRAM battery, boasting a Gestalt ID of 88 and supporting 32-bit addressing. However, in contrast to most Macintosh models, it does not offer any expansion slots for upgrades.

== Upgrades ==
Although there was no official upgrade path provided by Apple, the Macintosh TV chassis is essentially that of the LC 520, and as such supports the same motherboard upgrades. Although the built-in tuner capabilities are lost, installing an LC 575 motherboard is a common method to step up to the significantly faster 68040 processor.

== Timeline ==
Timeline of Macintosh Centris, LC, Performa, and Quadra models, colored by CPU type

See also: List of Mac models

== See also ==
- Apple Interactive Television Box
- Power Macintosh G3 beige
- Apple TV
- iMac
