= Macintosh LC III =

Personal computer by Apple, Inc.

Macintosh LC III/III+ Performa 450/460/466/467
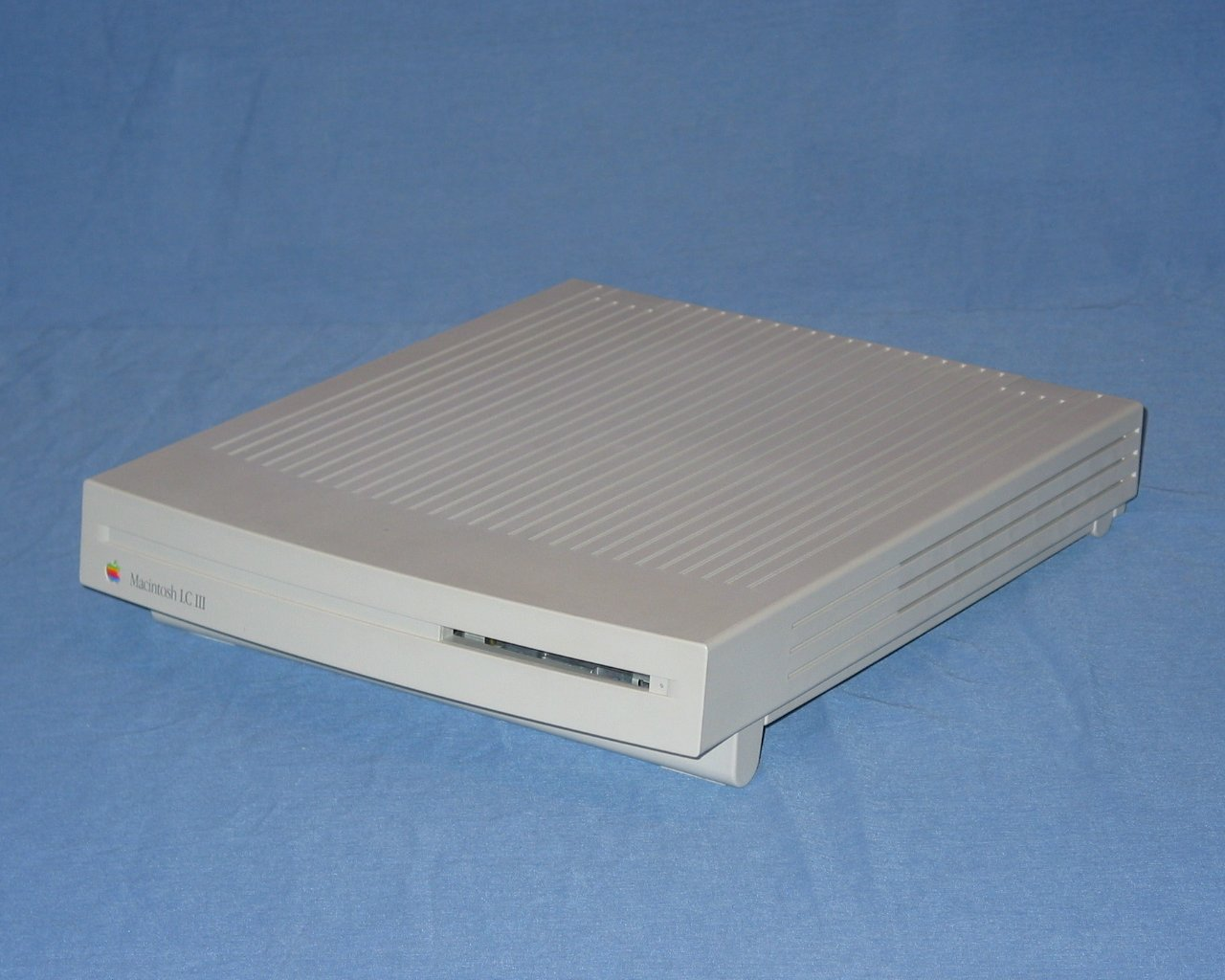
- Macintosh LC III (original design) without monitor, keyboard, or mouse
- Developer: Apple Computer
- Product family: LC, Performa
- Released: February 10, 1993
- Introductory price: US$1,349 (equivalent to $3,010 in 2025)
- Discontinued: February 14, 1994
- Operating system: System 7.1 – Mac OS 7.6.1
- CPU: Motorola 68030 @ 25 MHz or 33 MHz (III+ and Performa 460/466/467)
- Memory: 4 MB, expandable to 36 MB (72-pin SIMM)
- Dimensions: 2.9 × 12.2 × 15.3 in (74 × 310 × 389 mm)
- Weight: 8.8 lb (4.0 kg)
- Predecessor: Macintosh LC II
- Successor: Macintosh LC 475

The Macintosh LC III is a personal computer designed, manufactured, and sold by Apple Computer from February 1993 to February 1994. It replaced the commercially successful Macintosh LC II in Apple's lineup of mid-class computers, and was significantly faster, with MacWorld Magazine benchmarks showing double the performance. It was also significantly less expensive; the LC III with an 80 MB hard disk was priced at US$1,349 at introduction, $700 less than the LC II. The LC III was sold primarily (but not exclusively) to educational institutions, and a corresponding Performa variant called the Performa 450 was sold to the consumer market.

A speed-bumped version, called the Macintosh LC III+ was released in October of the same year, with a 33 MHz CPU. Three Performa variants of this model were released: the Performa 460, 466 and 467. These faster models replaced the LC III and Performa 450, with sales of the original models continuing until the end of 1993 as dealers depleted their stocks. New sales of the LC III+ ended in early 1994 as Apple neared the completion of the transition away from 68030 processors. The 68LC040-based LC 475 and Performa 475 were their replacements.

The LC III's logic board has 512 kB video RAM built in and one video RAM slot, which can be filled with a 256 kB SIMM to upgrade the total to 768 kB. A 512 kB SIMM may also be installed but it will function te same as a 256 kB SIMM.

An LC III (or LC) with 512 kB of video RAM (VRAM) supports display resolutions of 512 × 384 or 640 × 480 pixels (px) at 16-bit color and 832 × 624 px at 8 bits. With 768 kB it supports 16 bits at all three resolutions.

== Models ==
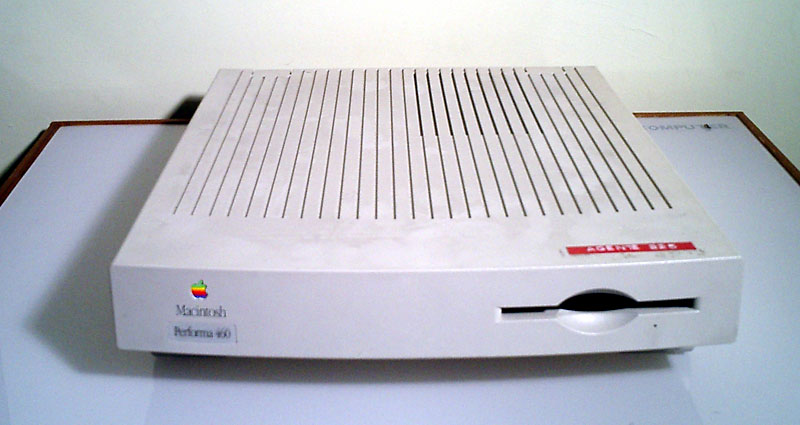
A Performa 460 with the revised front bezel

Introduced February 10, 1993:

- Macintosh LC III: 25 MHz 68030 CPU, 80 MB HDD.
- Macintosh Performa 450: 25 MHz 68030 CPU, 120 MB HDD.

Because of an Apple silkscreening error, one electrolytic capacitor is factory-installed backwards.

Introduced October 18, 1993:

- Macintosh LC III+: 33 MHz 68030 CPU.
- Macintosh Performa 460: 4 MB RAM, 80 MB HDD.
- Macintosh Performa 466: 4 MB RAM, 160 MB HDD.
- Macintosh Performa 467: 4 MB RAM, 160 MB HDD.

== Timeline ==
Timeline of Macintosh Centris, LC, Performa, and Quadra models, colored by CPU type

See also: List of Mac models
