= Macintosh LC =

Personal computer by Apple

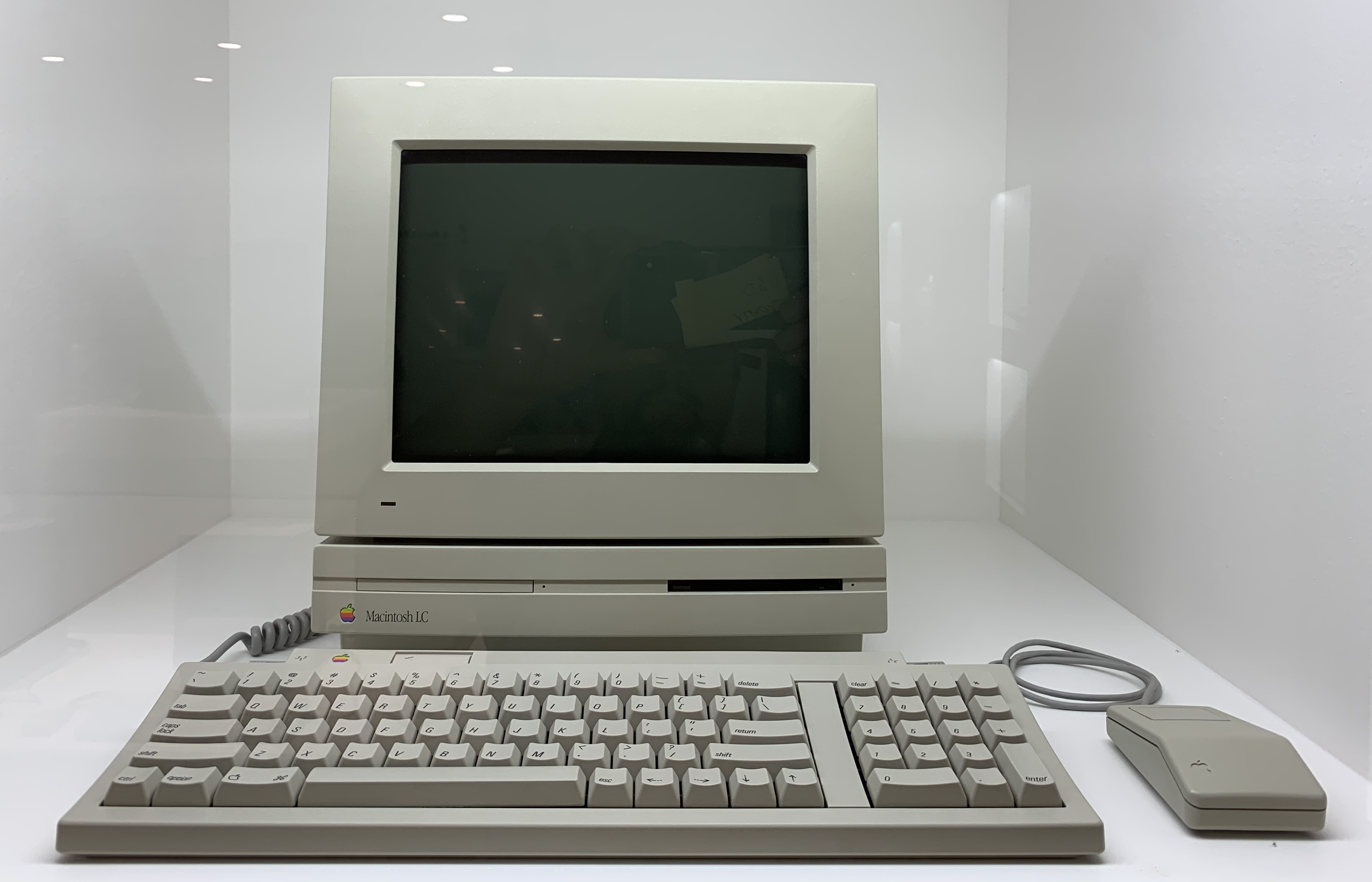
- A Macintosh LC with accessories
- Also known as: "Elsie"
- Developer: Apple Computer, Inc.
- Product family: Macintosh LC
- Released: October 15, 1990
- Introductory price: US$2,499 (equivalent to $6,158 in 2025)
- Discontinued: March 23, 1992
- Units sold: 560,000
- Operating system: System 6.0.6–7.5.5
- CPU: Motorola 68020 @ 15.66 MHz
- Memory: 2 MB, expandable to 10 MB (100ns 30-pin SIMM)
- Dimensions: 2.9 × 12.2 × 15.3 in (74 × 310 × 389 mm)
- Weight: 8.8 lb (4.0 kg)
- Successor: Macintosh LC II

The Macintosh LC is a personal computer designed, manufactured, and sold by Apple Computer, Inc. from October 1990 to March 1992. The "LC" in the name stood for Low Cost or Low-cost Color, a reference to it being the first affordable color Macintosh computer for the entry level consumer.

== Overview ==
The first in the Macintosh LC family, the LC was introduced alongside the Macintosh Classic (the lowest-cost Mac) and the Macintosh IIsi (a new entry-level machine for the Macintosh II series), and offered for half the price of the Macintosh II but significantly lesser in performance overall. The creation of the LC was prompted by Apple's desire to produce a product that could be sold to school boards for the same price as an Apple IIGS. It was designed for inexpensive manufacturing with just five basic components (logic board, power supply, hard drive, floppy drive and a fan/speaker assembly) and four cables that could all be inserted into the case by a robot. The computer had a $2,400 list price; it and the new $600 12-inch color display were $3,500 less expensive than the Macintosh II. Not long after the Apple IIe Card was introduced for the LC, Apple quietly removed the IIGS from its price list, forcibly retiring it, as the company wanted to focus its sales and marketing efforts on the LC.

The original Macintosh LC was introduced in October 1990, with initial shipments to dealers following in December and January. It was discontinued in March 1992 and replaced by Macintosh LC II, which was largely the same but built around the Motorola 68030 processor.

The LC could be upgraded by replacing its logic board with one from the LC II or LC III. Macworld considered the LC II upgrade overpriced relative to its limited benefits, but recommended the LC III upgrade, priced at US$599 in 1993 (equivalent to $1,335 in 2025) as a more cost-effective option, citing its improved performance, video capabilities, and memory support.

== Hardware ==
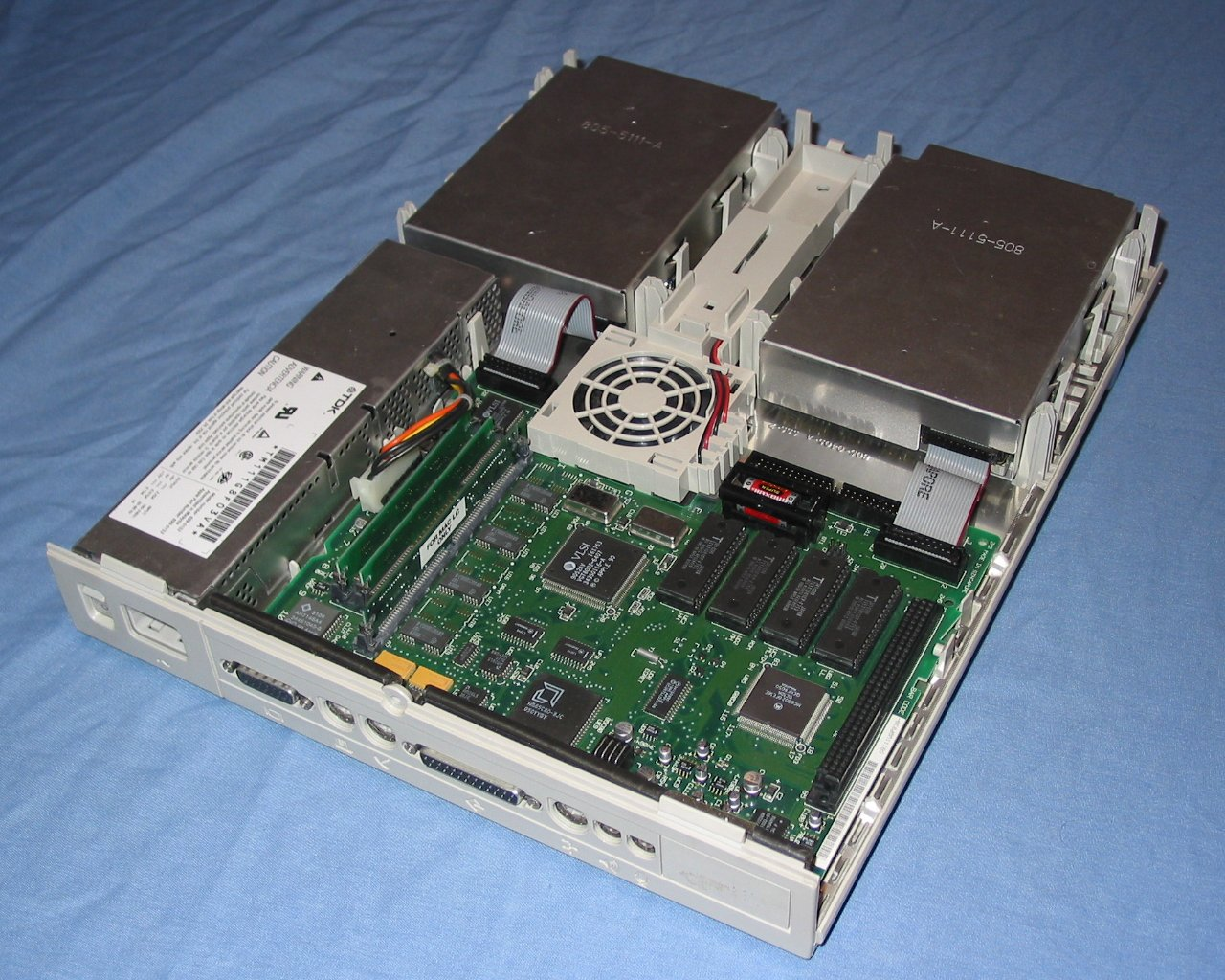
Internal view of a Macintosh LC with two floppy drives

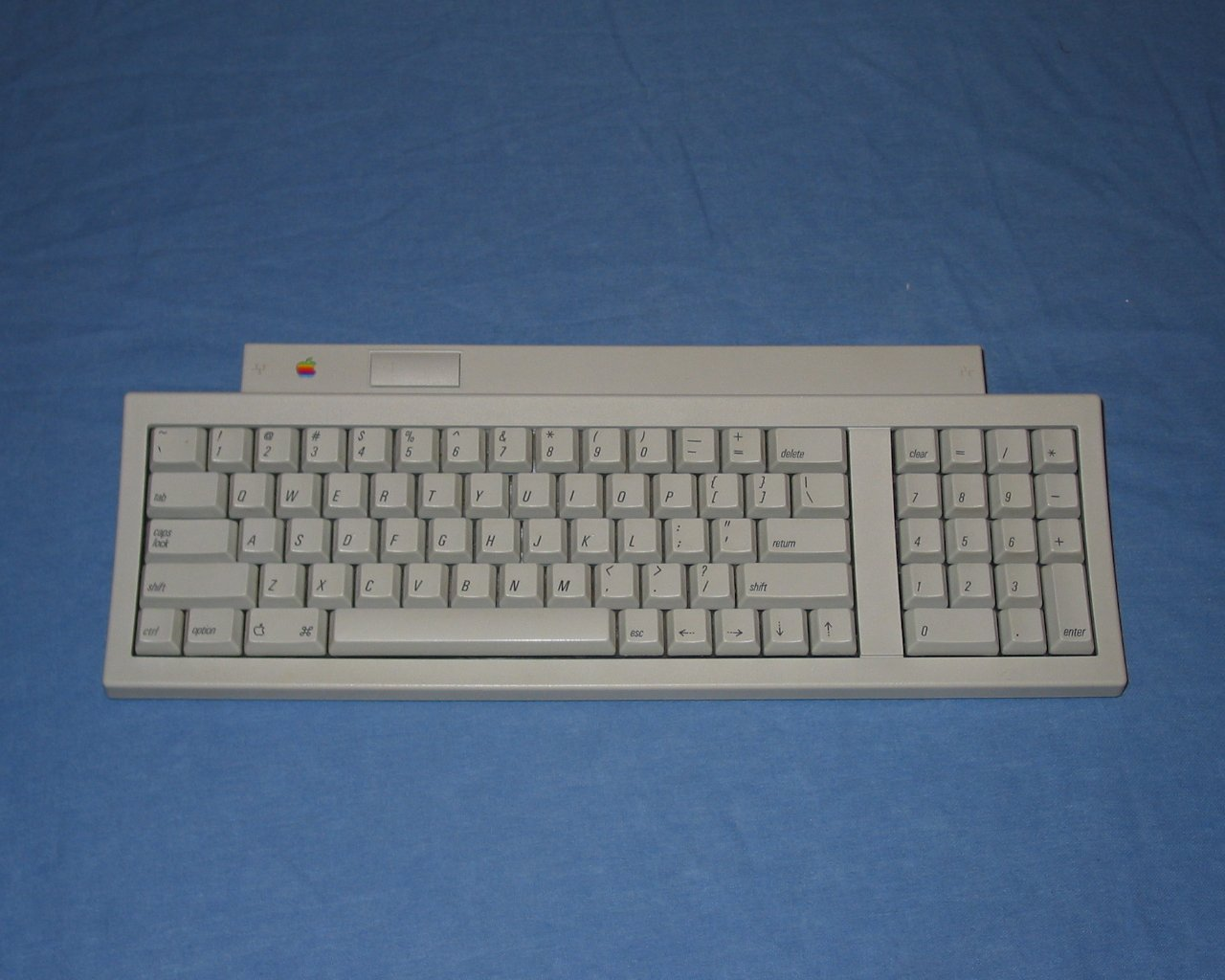
The Apple Keyboard II is the Macintosh LC's standard keyboard.

The LC uses a "pizza box" case with a Processor Direct Slot (PDS) but no NuBus slots. It has a 16 MHz Motorola 68020 microprocessor, but no floating-point coprocessor (although one could be added via the PDS). The LC has a 16-bit data bus, which is a major performance bottleneck as the 68020 is a 32-bit CPU. The LC's memory management chipset places a limit of 10 MB RAM no matter how much was installed.

The LC was commonly sold with a 12-inch shadow mask color monitor that was introduced alongside the computer. The monitor had a resolution of 512 × 384 pixels, and its width and curvature matched the LC's case. It was priced at US$599 (equivalent to $1,476 in 2025). The LC also supported Apple's existing 13-inch Trinitron display, but it had a resolution of 640 × 480 px and a list price of US$999 (equivalent to $2,462 in 2025), nearly half the price of the computer itself.

The LC shipped with 256 kB of video RAM (VRAM), supporting a display resolution of 512 × 384 pixels at 8-bit color or 640 × 480 pixels at 4 bits. The VRAM can be upgraded to 512 kB, supporting a display resolution of 512 × 384 pixels at 16 bits or 640 × 480 pixels at 8 bits. Before the LC, the lowest display resolution supported by a color Macintosh was 640 × 480 pixels.

Overall performance of the machine was limited by its 16-bit data bus, causing it to perform worse than the Macintosh II from 1987, which used the same 16 MHz 68020 processor but had a faster 32-bit system architecture and was paired with a 68881 FPU (floating-point unit). The LC also did not include a socket for the 68851 MMU (memory management unit), preventing it from supporting the virtual memory features introduced in System 7.

The standard configuration included a floppy drive and either a 40 MB or 80 MB hard drive. A version sold to schools included an Apple IIe Card in the PDS, two internal floppy drives, and no hard drive. The LC was the final Macintosh model to support two internal floppy drives.

Like other Macintosh models of the period, it supported networking through the serial port using LocalTalk. Apple offered Ethernet as an option through the PDS slot. Multi-function expansion cards were also available that combined Ethernet with a socket for either a FPU.

== Apple IIe Card ==
The Apple IIe Card, available for the PDS slot, was bundled with some education models of the LC. The card allowed the computer to emulate an Apple IIe. It provided compatibility with existing Apple II software while allowing schools to use Macintosh hardware. LCs equipped with the card and the 12-inch color monitor could switch to a 560 × 384 display mode for improved compatibility with the Apple IIe's 280 × 192 high-resolution graphics and 560 × 192 double high-resolution graphics modes.

== Reception ==
Computer Gaming World in 1990 criticized the LC as too expensive, stating that consumers would prefer a $2,000 IBM PS/1 with VGA graphics to a $3,000 LC with color monitor. Although the Classic was more popular at first, by May 1992 the LC (560,000 sold) was outselling the Classic (1.2 million). More than half of LCs were used in homes and schools; Apple claimed that it helped the company regain educational market share lost to inexpensive PC clones, with the IIe Card used in about half of schools' LCs.

== Timeline ==
Timeline of Macintosh Centris, LC, Performa, and Quadra models, colored by CPU type

See also: List of Mac models
