= List of Apple products =

Apple Inc., a technology company headquartered in Cupertino, California, has released a variety of products since its inception in 1976, ranging from computers, music players, phones, tablets, wearables, headphones, and more.

This is a list of all products made by Apple Inc. This list is ordered by the release date of the products. Macintosh Performa models were often physically identical to other models, in which case they are omitted in favor of the identical twin.

== Detailed timeline ==
=== 1970s ===
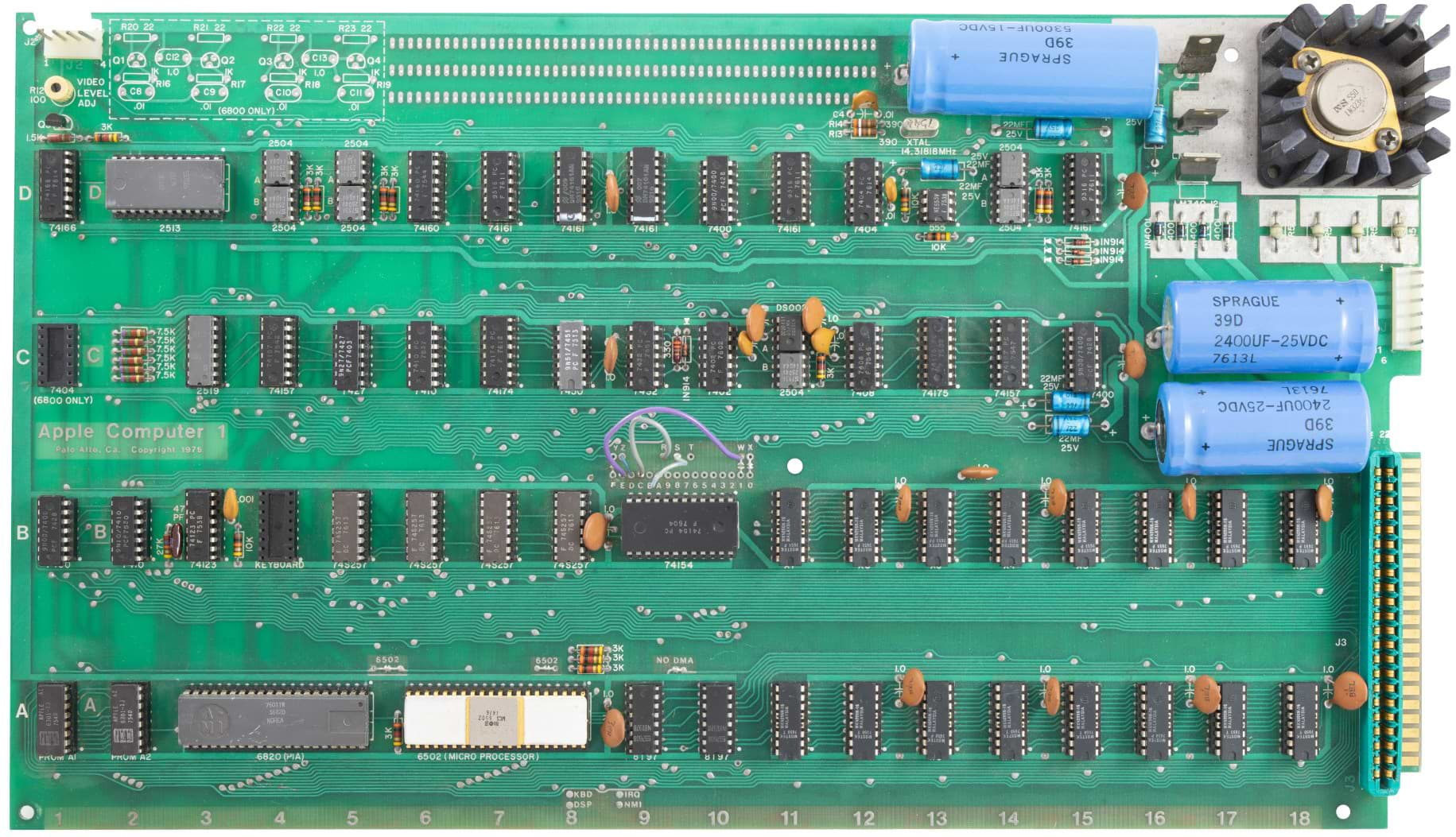
Apple I

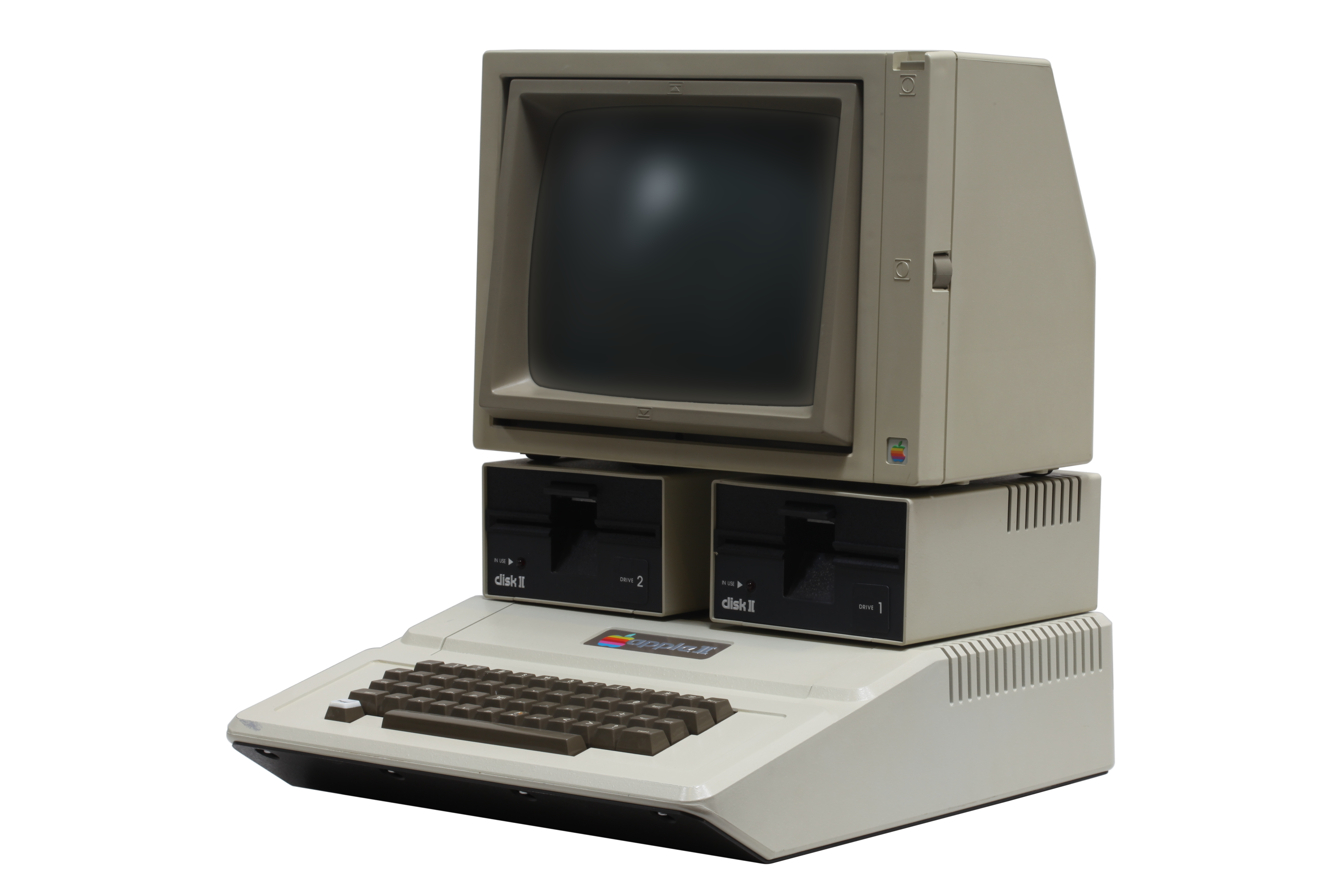
Apple II

Released	Model	Family	Discontinued
July 1976	Apple I	Apple I	September 30, 1977
June 10, 1977	Apple II	Apple II	May 1979
June 1, 1978	Disk II	Drives	May 1, 1984
June 1979	Apple II Plus	Apple II	December 1, 1982
June 1979	Apple II EuroPlus	Apple II	December 1, 1982
June 1979	Apple II J-Plus	Apple II	December 1, 1982
June 1979	Bell & Howell	Apple II	December 1, 1982
June 1979	Bell & Howell Disk II	Drives	December 1, 1982
June 1979	Apple Silentype	Printers	October 1, 1982

=== 1980s ===
==== 1980–1983 ====
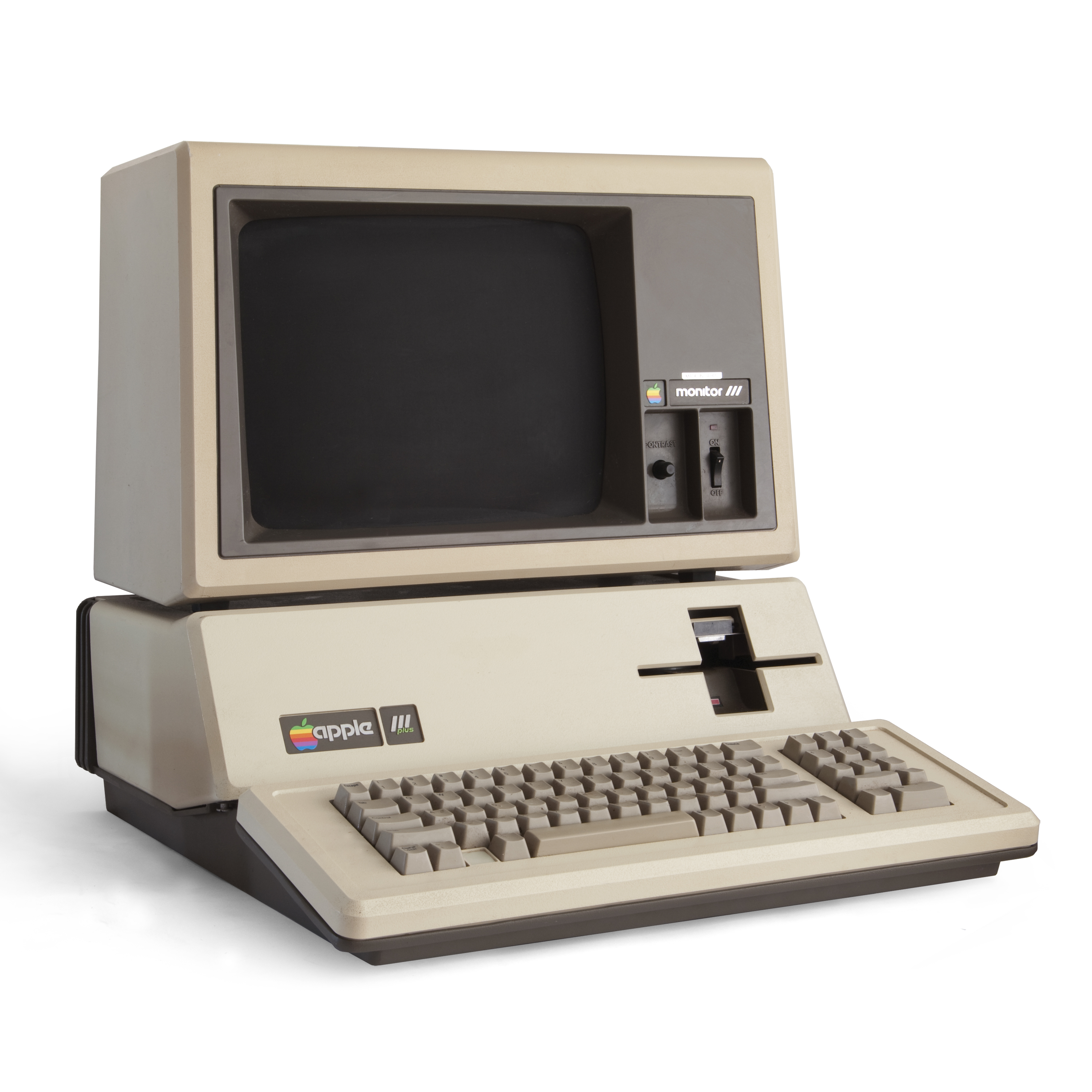
Apple III

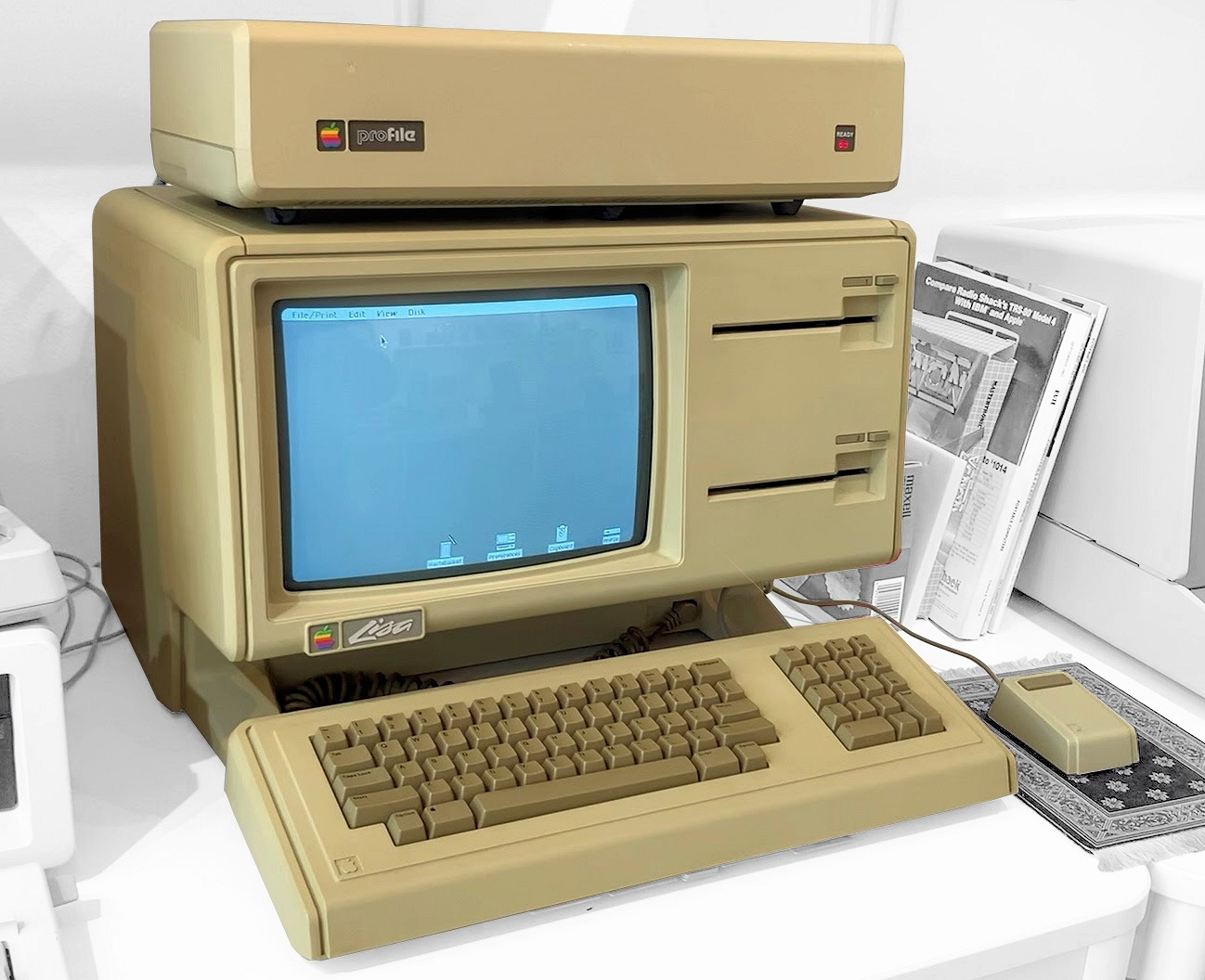
Apple Lisa

Released	Model	Family	Discontinued
November 1, 1980	Apple III	Apple III	December 1, 1981
November 1, 1980	Modem IIB (Novation CAT)	Modems	December 1, 1981
November 1, 1980	Printer IIA (Centronics 779)	Printers	December 1, 1981
November 1, 1980	Monitor III	Displays	October 1, 1985
November 1, 1980	Disk III	Drives	May 1, 1984
September 1, 1981	Apple ProFile	Drives	September 1, 1986
December 1, 1981	Apple III Revised	Apple III	December 1, 1983
October 1, 1982	Apple Dot Matrix Printer	Printers	December 1, 1983
October 1, 1982	Apple Daisy Wheel Printer	Printers	December 1, 1983
January 1, 1983	Apple IIe	Apple II	March 1, 1985
January 19, 1983	Apple Lisa	68000	January 1, 1984
August 1983	Monitor II (various third party)	Displays	November 1993
December 1, 1983	Apple III Plus	Apple III	April 24, 1984
December 1, 1983	ImageWriter	ImageWriter	December 1, 1985

==== 1984 ====
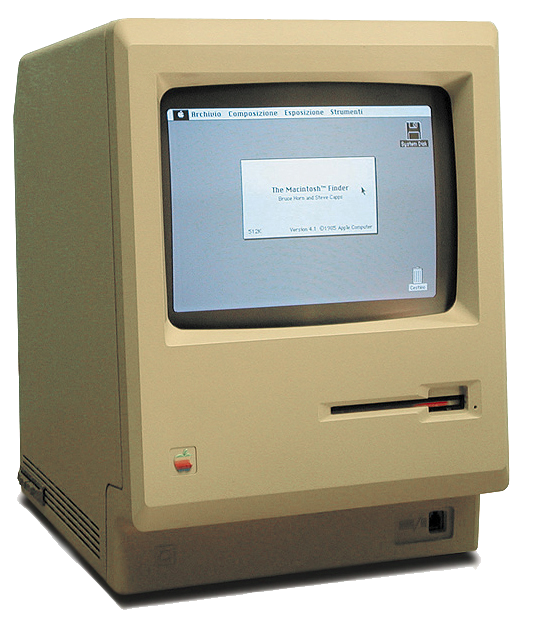
Macintosh 128K without its keyboard and mouse

Released	Model	Family	Discontinued
January 1, 1984	Apple Lisa 2	68000	August 1, 1986
January 24, 1984	Macintosh (128K)	Compact	September 10, 1984
January 24, 1984	Macintosh External Disk Drive (400K)	Drives	January 1, 1986
January 24, 1984	Macintosh Numeric Keypad	Numeric Keypads	[?]
January 24, 1984	Apple Modem 300, 1984	Modems	[?]
January 24, 1984	Apple Modem 1200, 1984	Modems	[?]
April 1, 1984	Apple IIc	Apple II	August 1, 1988
April 1, 1984	Apple Scribe Printer	Printers	December 1, 1985
April 1, 1984	Apple Mouse IIc	Pointing devices	December 1, 1985
April 1, 1984	Disk IIc	Drives	[?]
May 1, 1984	DuoDisk	Drives	[?]
June, 1984	Apple 410 Color Plotter	Printers	[?]
June, 1984	ImageWriter Wide Carriage	Printers	[?]
September 10, 1984	Macintosh 512K	Compact	April 14, 1986
September 10, 1984	Macintosh 128K (revised)	Compact	October 1, 1985
December 1984	AppleColor 100	Displays	[?]

==== 1985 ====
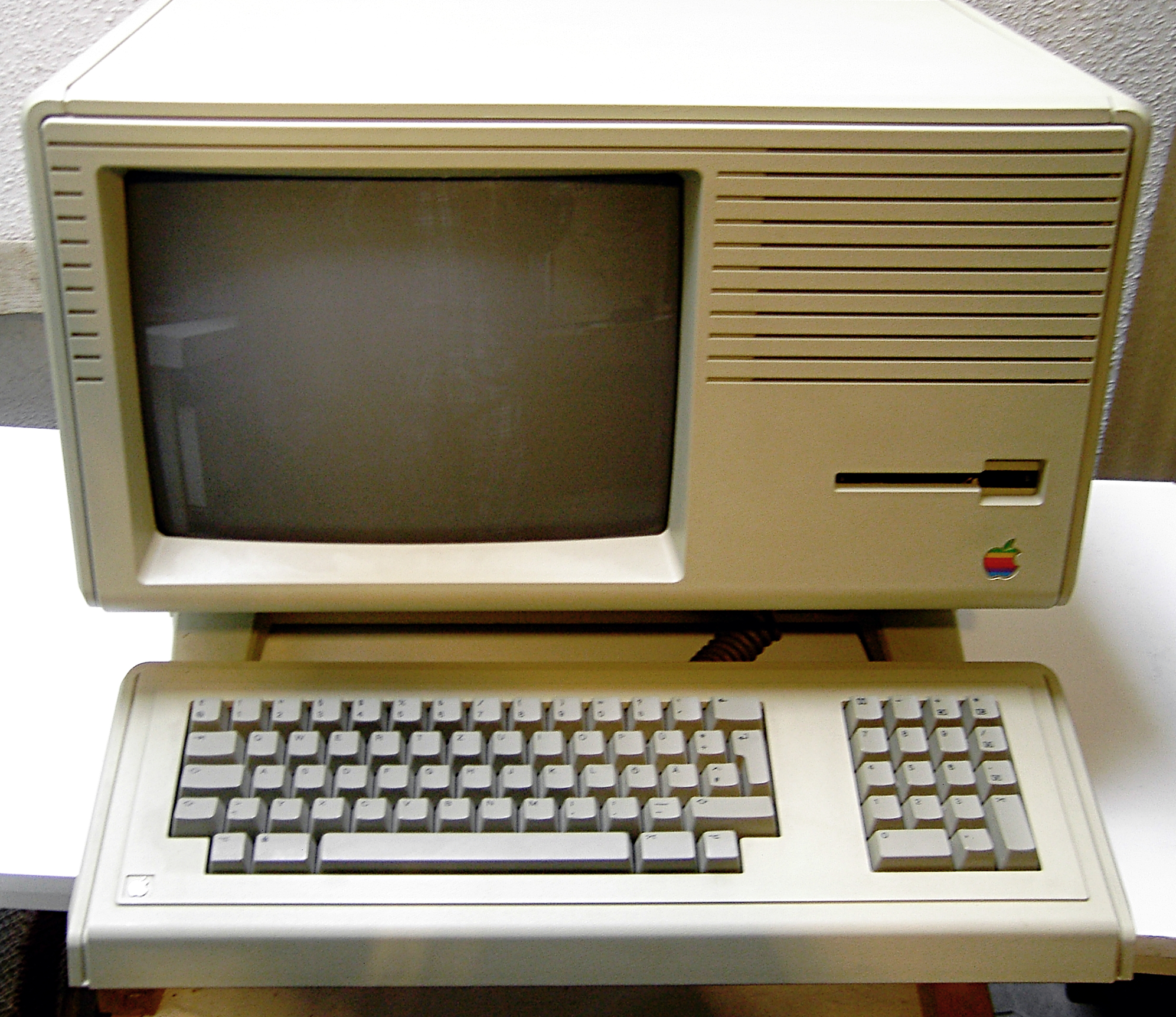
Macintosh XL

Released	Model	Family	Discontinued
January 1, 1985	Macintosh XL	68000	April 1, 1985
January 1, 1985	LaserWriter	Printers	December 1, 1985
January 1, 1985	Apple LocalTalk Connector	Networking	[?]
March 1, 1985	Apple IIe Enhanced	Apple II	January 1, 1987
April 1, 1985	Apple Personal Modem	Modems	[?]
April 1, 1985	ImageWriter II	Printers	1996
June 1985	Apple UniDisk	Drives	September 1, 1986
September 1, 1985	Macintosh Hard Disk 20	Drives	[?]
September 1, 1985	Apple UniDisk 3.5	Drives	January 1, 1987
September 1, 1985	Apple ColorMonitor IIe	Displays	[?]
September 1, 1985	Apple ColorMonitor IIc	Displays	[?]

==== 1986 ====
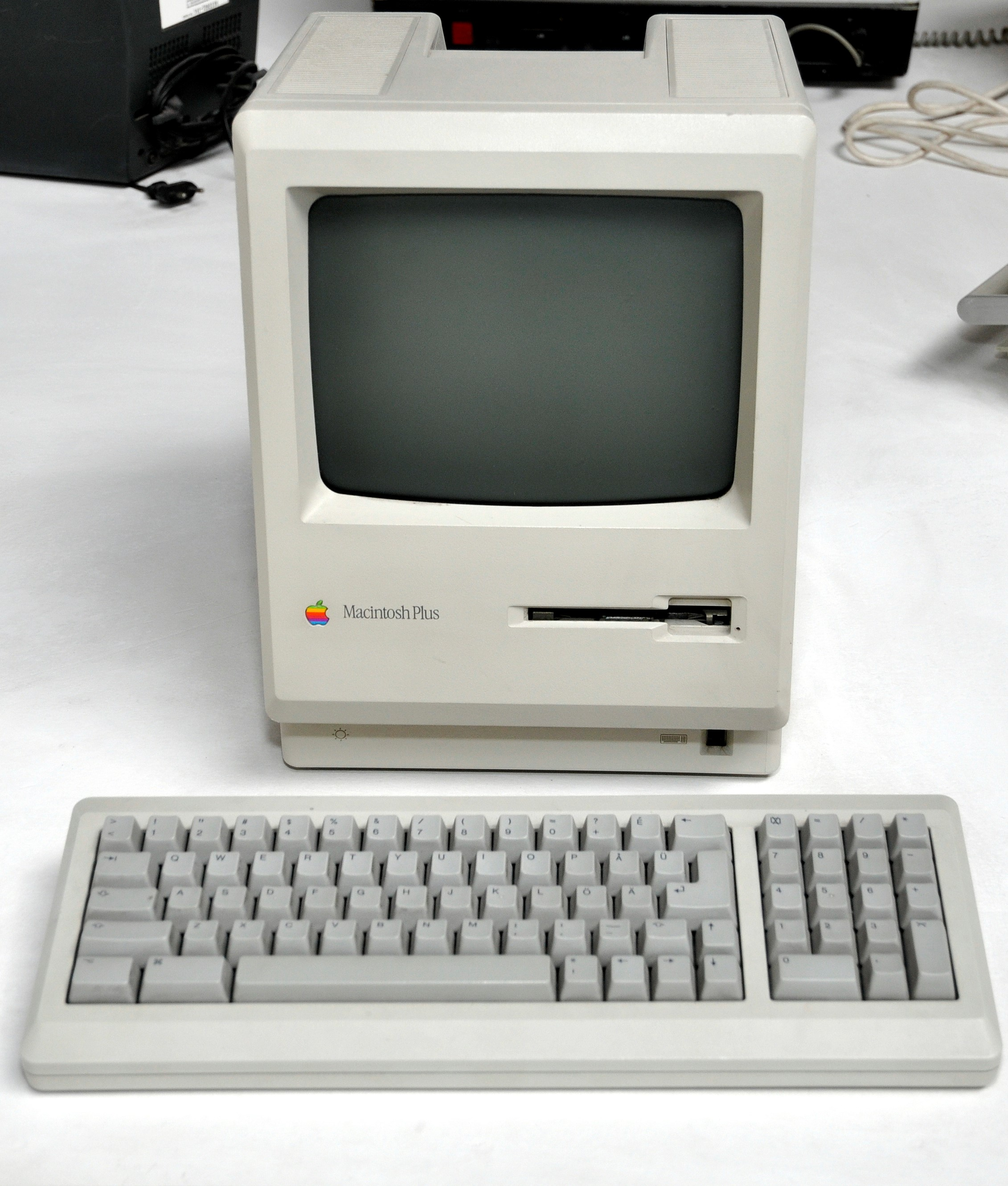
Macintosh Plus, no mouse shown

Released	Model	Family	Discontinued
January 16, 1986	Macintosh Plus	Compact	October 15, 1990
January 16, 1986	Macintosh 800K External Drive	Drives	[?]
January 16, 1986	LaserWriter Plus	Printers	[?]
April 14, 1986	Macintosh 512Ke	Compact	October 1, 1987
September 15, 1986	Apple IIGS	Apple II	December 1, 1992
September 15, 1986	Apple IIc Memory Expansion	Apple II	September 1, 1988
September 15, 1986	Apple Hard Disk 20SC	Drives	[?]
September 15, 1986	Apple 3.5 Drive	Drives	[?]
September 15, 1986	Apple 5.25 Drive	Drives	[?]
September 15, 1986	AppleColor RGB Monitor	Displays	[?]
September 15, 1986	Apple Monochrome Monitor	Displays	[?]
September 15, 1986	AppleColor Composite Monitor	Displays	[?]

==== 1987 ====
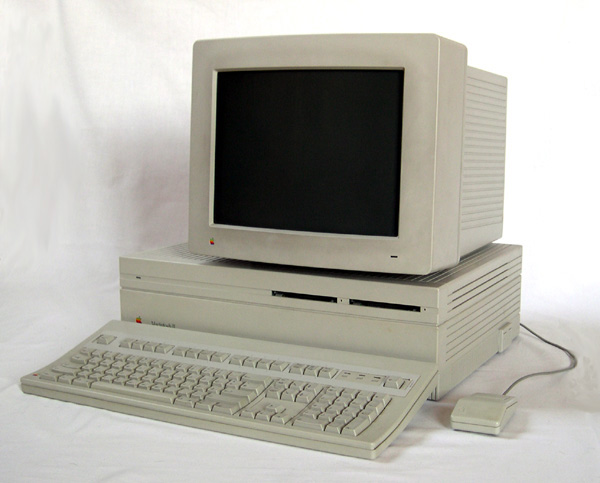
Macintosh II

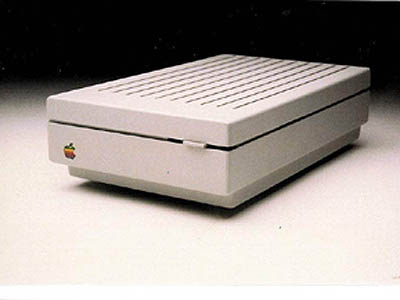
AppleFax Modem

Released	Model	Family	Discontinued
January 1, 1987	Macintosh Plus (Platinum)	Compact	October 15, 1990
January 1, 1987	Apple IIe Platinum	Apple II	November 1, 1993
March 2, 1987	Macintosh SE	Compact	August 1, 1989
March 2, 1987	Macintosh II	Mac II	January 15, 1990
March 2, 1987	AppleColor High-Resolution RGB Monitor	Displays	December 1992
August 1987	ImageWriter LQ	Printers	December 1990
August 1987	AppleFax Modem	Modems	[?]
August 1987	Apple PC 5.25" Drive	Drives	[?]
August 1987	Apple Tape Backup 40SC	Drives	[?]

==== 1988 ====
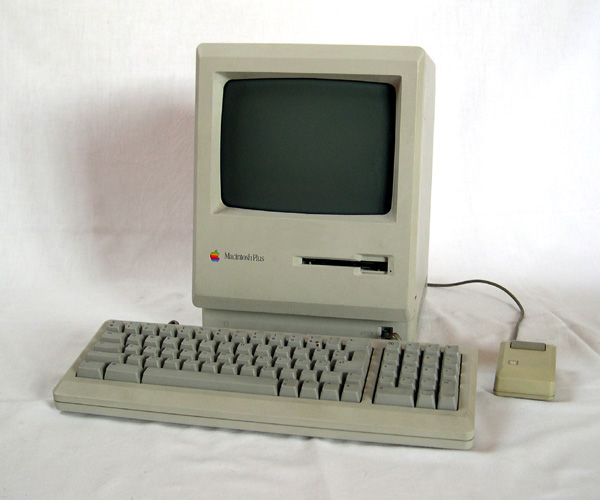
Macintosh Plus

Released	Model	Family	Discontinued
January 1, 1988	LaserWriter II SC, II NT, II NTX	Printers	[?]
March 1988	AppleCD SC	Drives	[?]
August 1988	Apple Scanner	Scanner	[?]
September 1, 1988	Apple IIc Plus	Apple II	September 1, 1990
September 19, 1988	Macintosh IIx	Macintosh II	October 15, 1990

==== 1989 ====
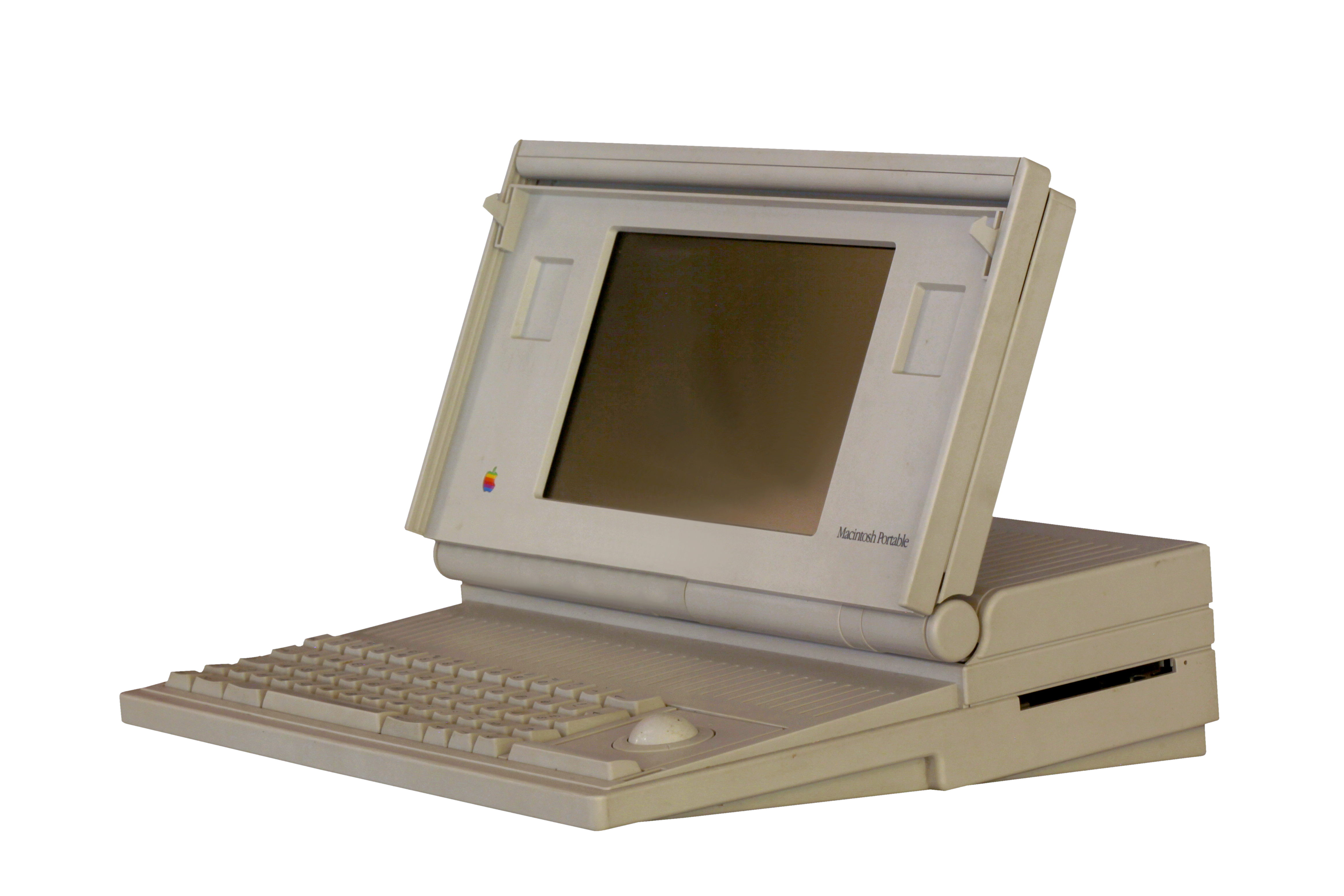
Macintosh Portable

Released	Model	Family	Discontinued
January 19, 1989	Macintosh SE/30	Compact	October 21, 1991
March 7, 1989	Macintosh IIcx	Mac II	March 11, 1991
March 7, 1989	Apple Two Page Monochrome Monitor	Displays	October 19, 1992
March 7, 1989	Apple Macintosh Portrait Display	Displays	October 19, 1992
March 7, 1989	Apple High-Resolution Monochrome Display	Displays	February 1, 1991
July 1989	Apple Modem 2400	Modems	December 1992
August 1, 1989	Macintosh SE FDHD	Compact	October 15, 1990
August 1, 1989	Apple FDHD SuperDrive	Drives	[?]
September 20, 1989	Macintosh IIci	Mac II	February 20, 1993
September 20, 1989	Macintosh Portable	Portable	February 11, 1991
October 1, 1989	Apple IIGS (1 MB, ROM 3)	Apple II	December 1, 1992

=== 1990s ===
==== 1990 ====
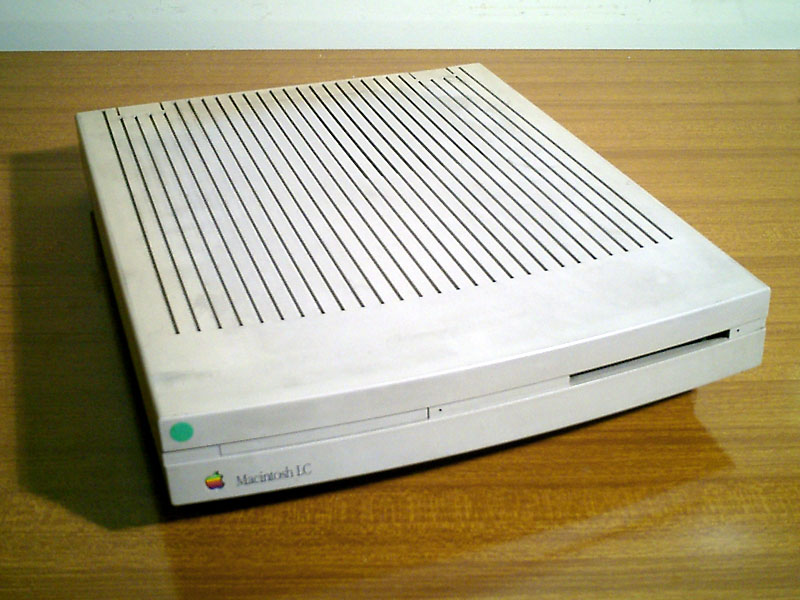
Macintosh LC

Released	Model	Family	Discontinued
March 19, 1990	Macintosh IIfx	Mac II	April 15, 1992
June 1, 1990	Personal LaserWriter SC	LaserWriter	September 1, 1993
October 15, 1990	Macintosh LC	Macintosh LC	March 23, 1992
October 15, 1990	Macintosh Classic	Compact	September 14, 1992
October 15, 1990	Macintosh IIsi	Mac II	March 15, 1993

==== 1991 ====
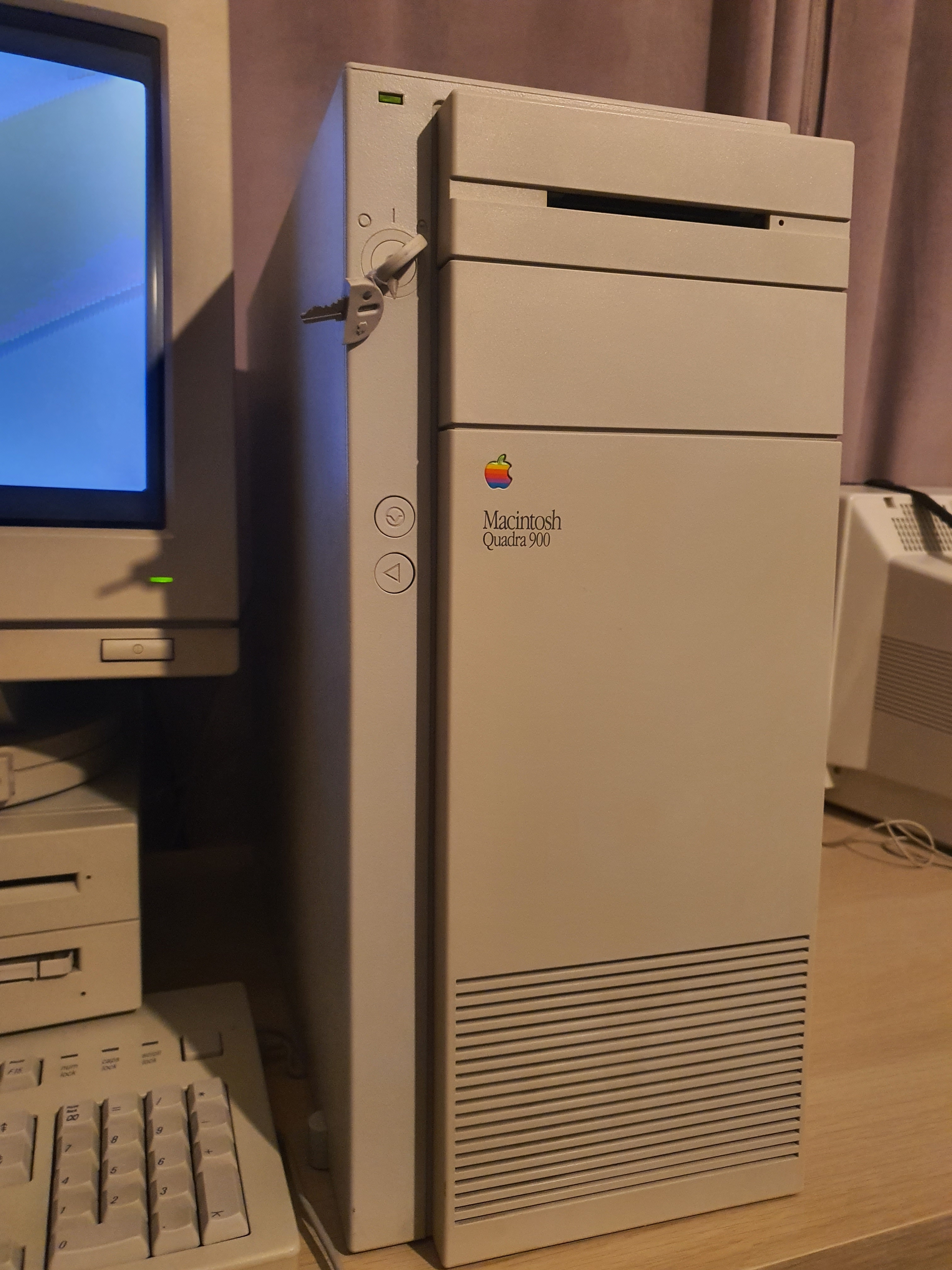
Macintosh Quadra 900

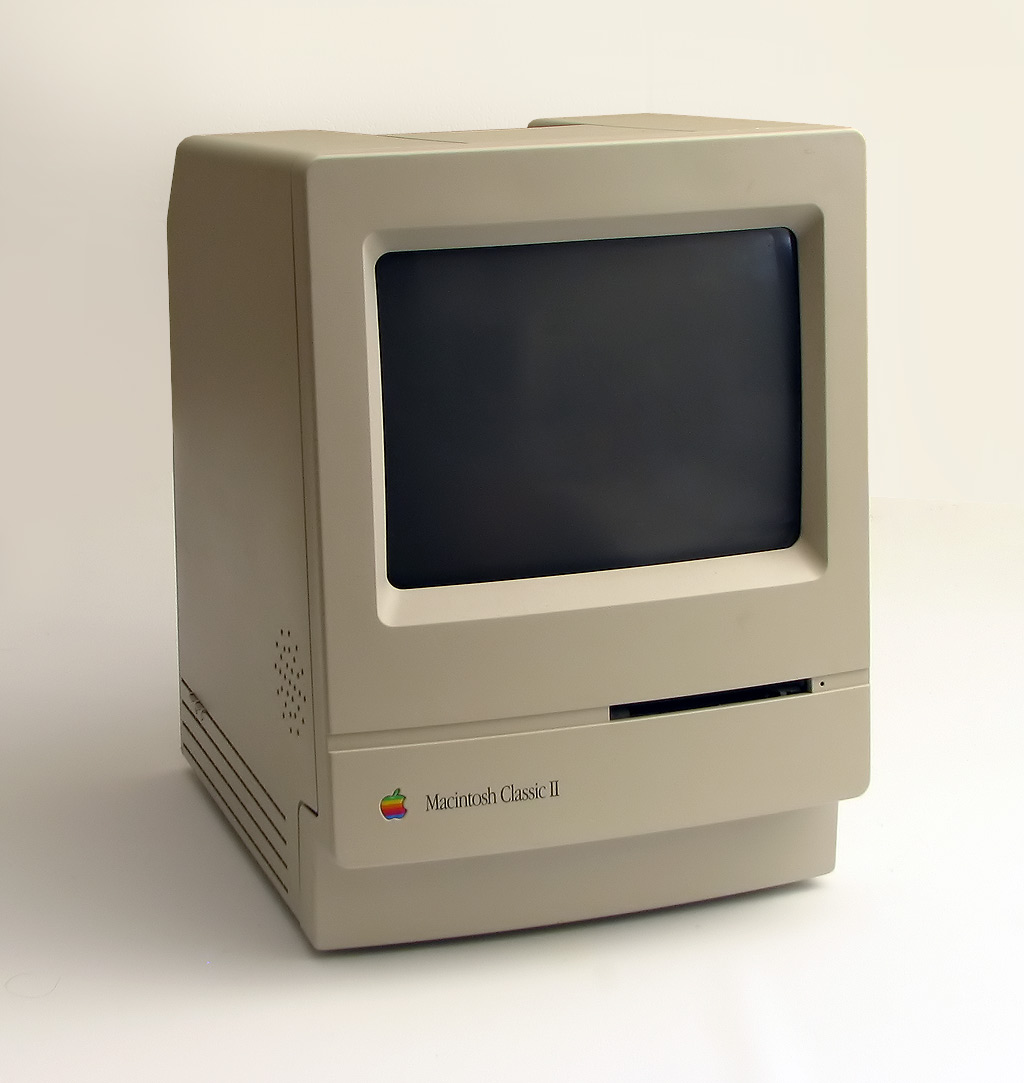
Macintosh Classic II

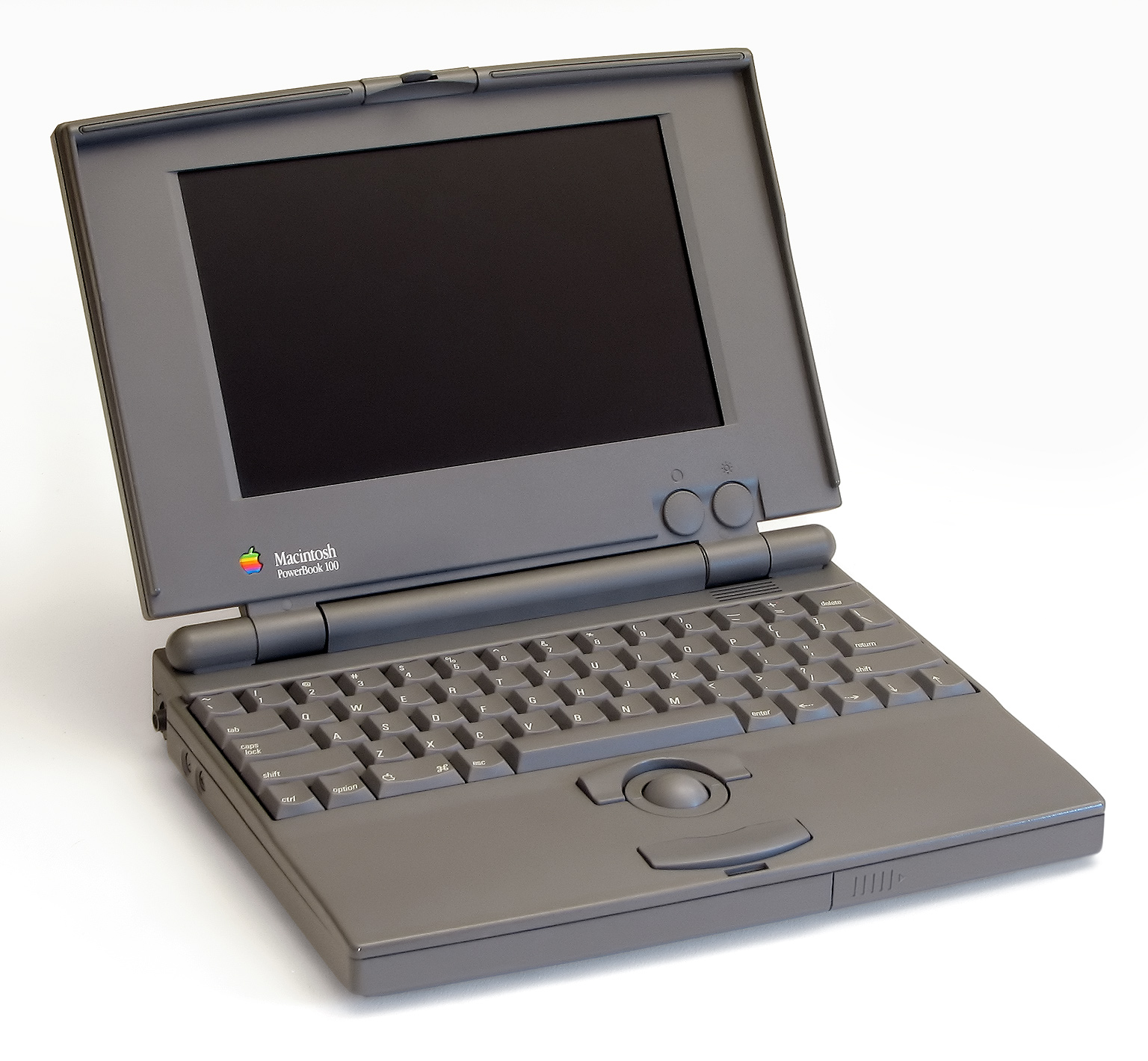
PowerBook 100

Released	Model	Family	Discontinued
February 11, 1991	Macintosh Portable (backlit screen)	Portable	October 21, 1991
March 1, 1991	Apple IIe Card	Apple II	May 1, 1995
March 1, 1991	Personal LaserWriter LS	LaserWriter	May 1, 1993
March 1, 1991	StyleWriter	StyleWriter	January 1, 1993
July 1, 1991	Personal LaserWriter NT	LaserWriter	[?]
October 1, 1991	LaserWriter IIf	LaserWriter	May 1, 1993
October 1, 1991	LaserWriter IIg	LaserWriter	October 1, 1993
October 21, 1991	Macintosh Classic II	Compact	September 13, 1993
October 21, 1991	Macintosh Quadra 700	Quadra	March 15, 1993
October 21, 1991	Macintosh Quadra 900	Quadra	May 18, 1992
October 21, 1991	PowerBook 100	PowerBook 100	August 3, 1992
October 21, 1991	PowerBook 140	PowerBook 100	August 3, 1992
October 21, 1991	PowerBook 170	PowerBook 100	October 19, 1992

==== 1992 ====
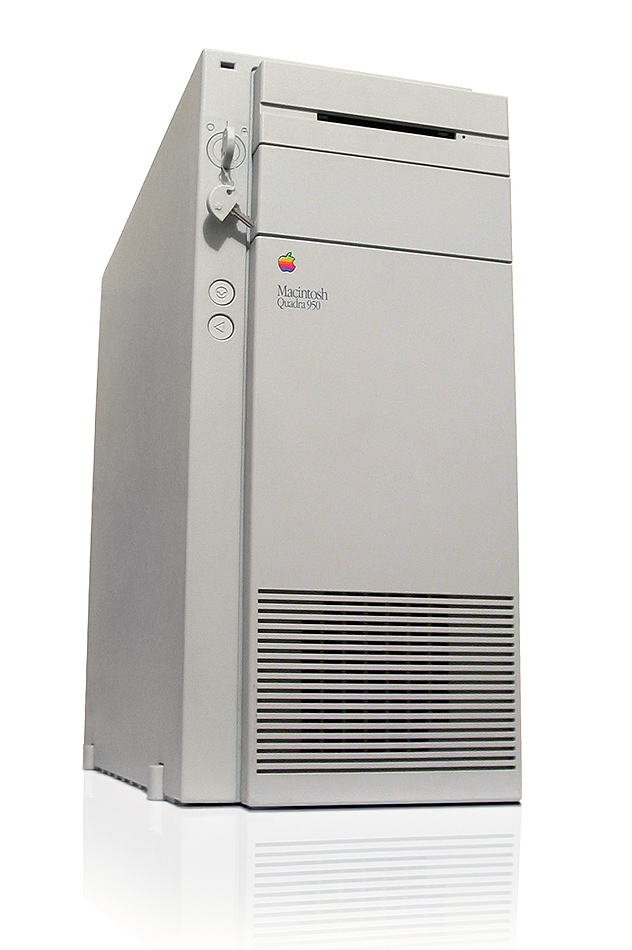
Quadra 950

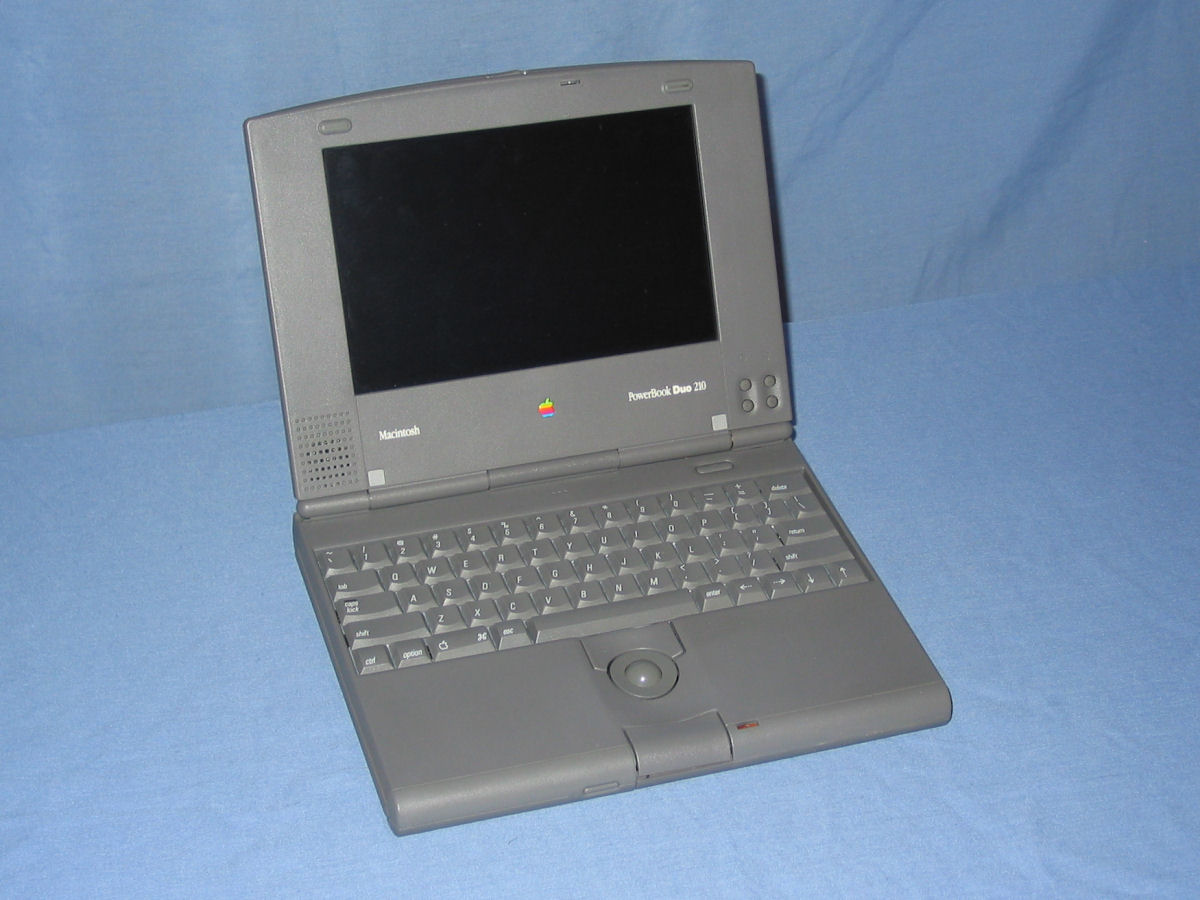
PowerBook Duo

Released	Model	Family	Discontinued
March 1, 1992	Personal LaserWriter NTR	LaserWriter	September 1, 1993
March 23, 1992	Macintosh LC II	Macintosh LC	March 15, 1993
May 18, 1992	Macintosh Quadra 950	Quadra	October 14, 1995
August 3, 1992	PowerBook 145	PowerBook 100	July 7, 1993
September 14, 1992	Apple Performa Plus Display	Displays	July 18, 1994
October 19, 1992	Macintosh IIvi	Mac II	February 10, 1993
October 19, 1992	Macintosh IIvx	Mac II	October 10, 1993
October 19, 1992	PowerBook 160	PowerBook 100	August 16, 1993
October 19, 1992	PowerBook 180	PowerBook 100	May 16, 1994
October 19, 1992	PowerBook Duo 210	PowerBook Duo	October 21, 1993
October 19, 1992	PowerBook Duo 230	PowerBook Duo	July 27, 1994
October 19, 1992	PowerBook Duo Dock	PowerBook Duo	July 27, 1994

==== 1993 ====
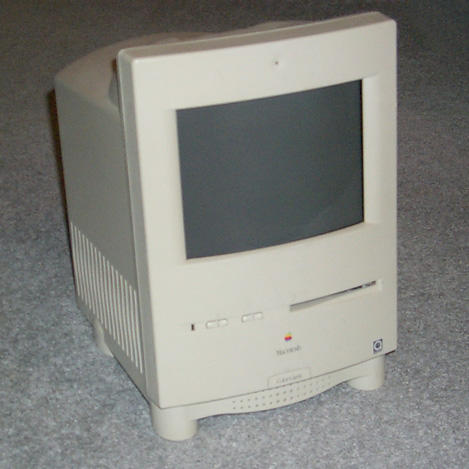
Macintosh Color Classic

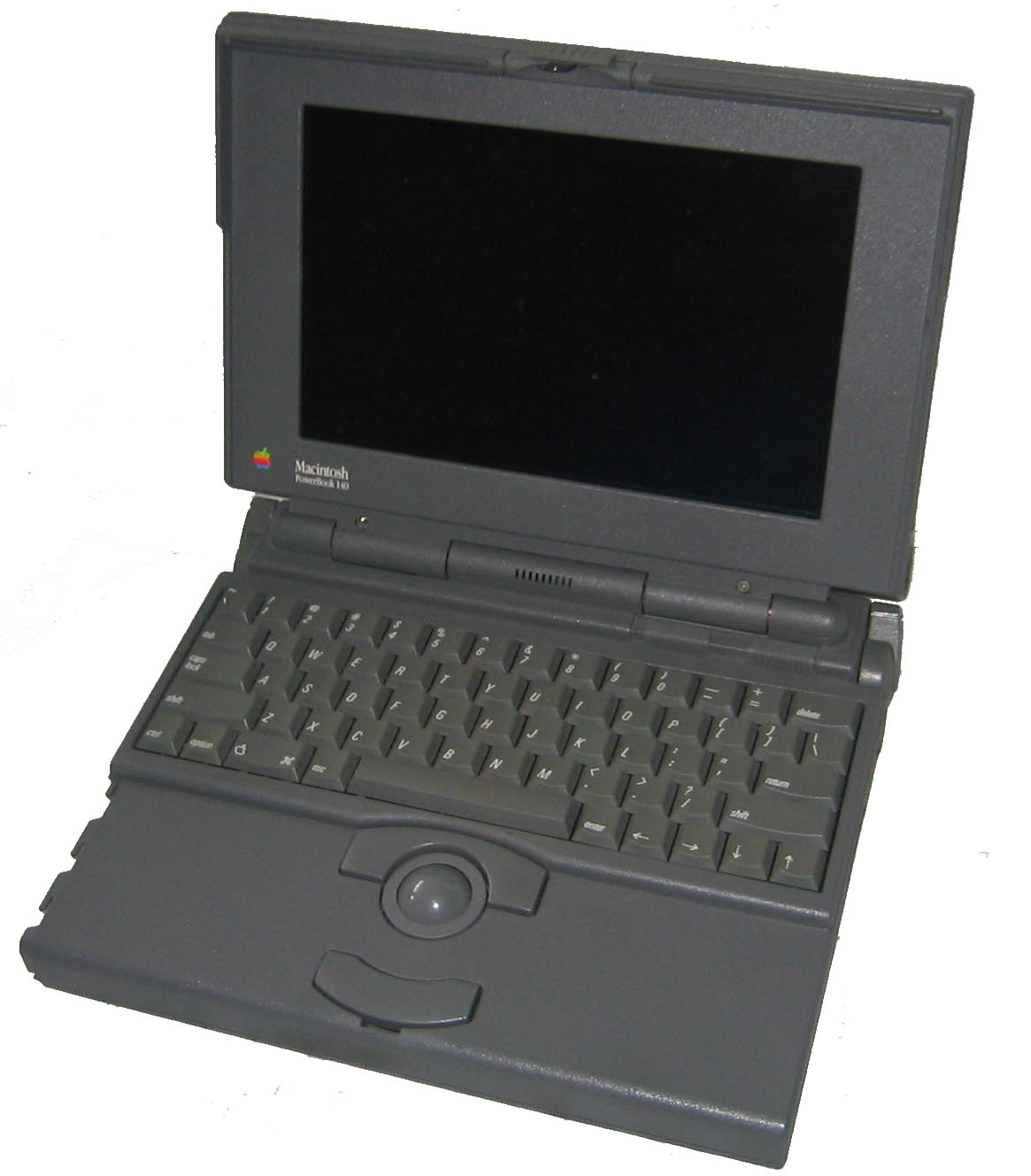
PowerBook 140

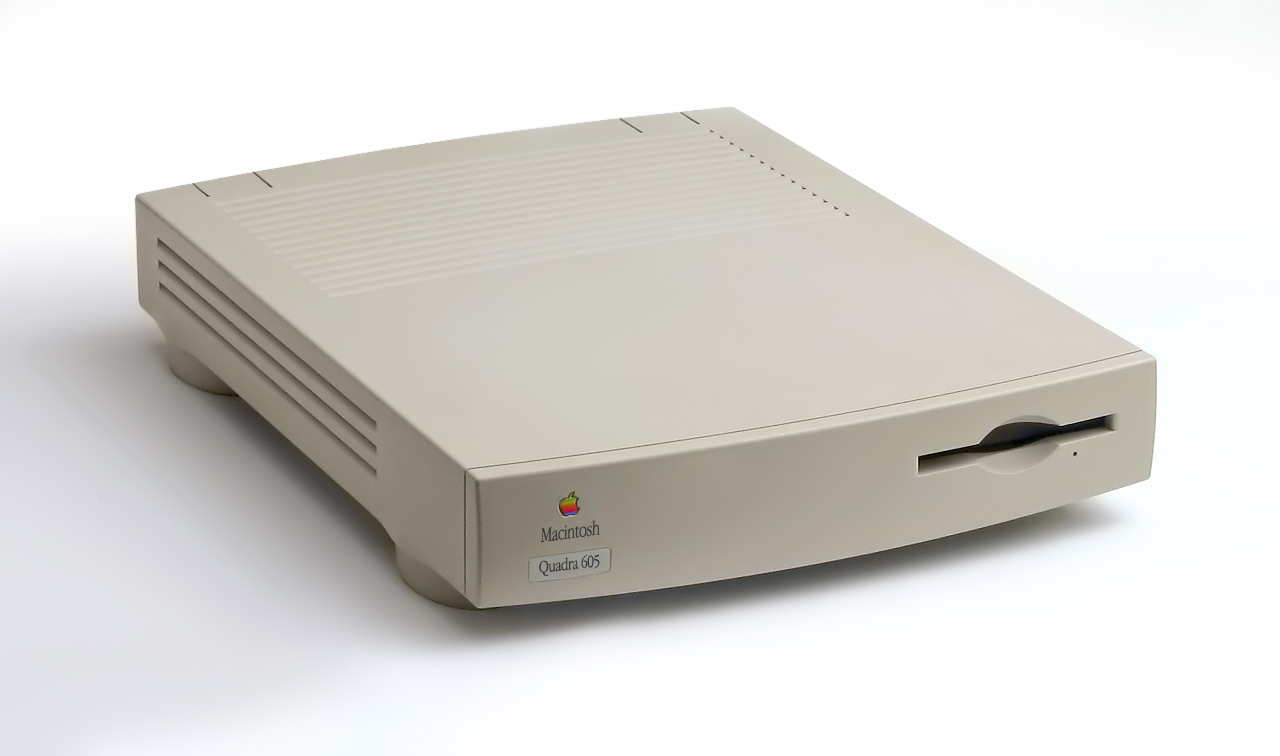
Quadra 605

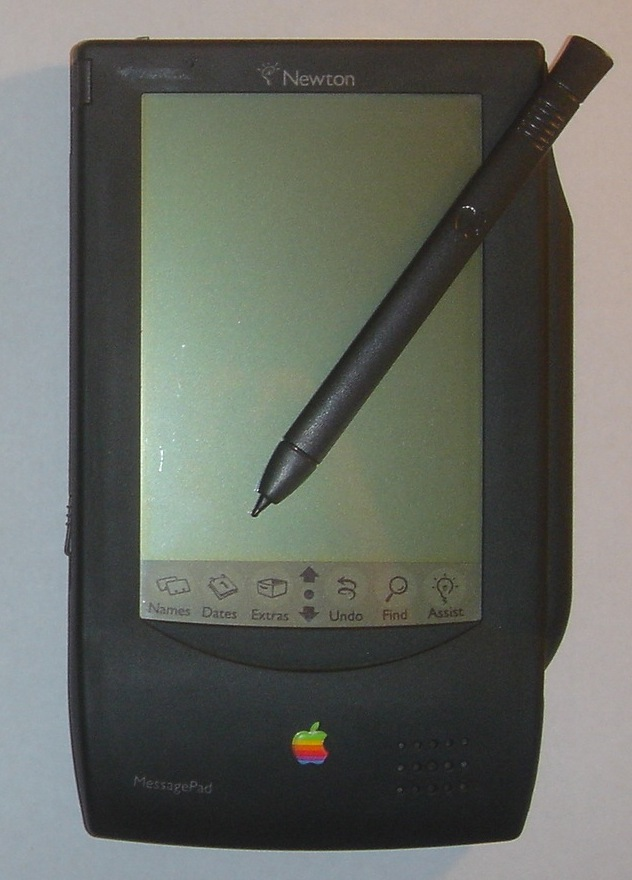
Newton MessagePad 100

Released	Model	Family	Discontinued
January 1, 1993	StyleWriter II	StyleWriter	April 17, 1995
January 1, 1993	Apple Color Printer	StyleWriter	February 1, 1994
January 1, 1993	LaserWriter Pro 600	LaserWriter	October 1, 1993
January 1, 1993	LaserWriter Pro 630	LaserWriter	September 1, 1994
February 10, 1993	Macintosh LC III	Macintosh LC	February 14, 1994
February 10, 1993	Macintosh Color Classic	Compact	May 16, 1994
February 10, 1993	Macintosh Centris/Quadra 610	Centris	October 21, 1993
February 10, 1993	Macintosh Centris/Quadra 650	Centris	October 21, 1993
February 10, 1993	Quadra 800	Quadra	March 14, 1994
February 10, 1993	PowerBook 165c	PowerBook 100	December 13, 1993
February 10, 1993	LaserWriter Select 300	LaserWriter	January 3, 1995
February 10, 1993	LaserWriter Select 310	LaserWriter	January 1, 1994
March 22, 1993	Workgroup Server 80	Workgroup Server	October 17, 1995
March 22, 1993	Workgroup Server 95	Workgroup Server	April 3, 1995
March 22, 1993	PowerCD	PowerCD	January 1, 1995
March 22, 1993	AppleDesign Powered Speakers	Speakers	January 1, 1995
June 7, 1993	PowerBook 145b	PowerBook 100	July 18, 1994
June 7, 1993	PowerBook 180c	PowerBook 100	March 14, 1994
June 1, 1993	Personal LaserWriter 300	LaserWriter	September 1, 1994
June 23, 1993	Portable StyleWriter	StyleWriter	May 15, 1995
June 28, 1993	Macintosh LC 520	Macintosh LC	February 2, 1994
July 26, 1993	Workgroup Server 60	Workgroup Server	October 17, 1995
July 29, 1993	Macintosh Centris/Quadra 660AV	Quadra	September 12, 1994
July 29, 1993	Quadra 840AV	Quadra	July 18, 1994
August 1, 1993	Apple AudioVision 14 Display	Displays	October 14, 1995
August 16, 1993	Newton Message Pad	Newton	March 1, 1994
August 16, 1993	PowerBook 165	PowerBook 100	July 18, 1994
October 1, 1993	LaserWriter Select 360	LaserWriter	April 22, 1996
October 1, 1993	LaserWriter Pro 810	LaserWriter	November 1, 1994
October 1, 1993	Personal LaserWriter 320	LaserWriter	September 16, 1995
October 18, 1993	Macintosh LC III+	Macintosh LC	February 14, 1994
October 21, 1993	Macintosh TV	Macintosh LC	February 1, 1995
October 21, 1993	Macintosh Color Classic II	Compact	November 1, 1995
October 21, 1993	Quadra 605	Quadra	October 17, 1994
October 21, 1993	Quadra 610	Quadra	July 18, 1994
October 21, 1993	Quadra 650	Quadra	September 12, 1994
October 21, 1993	PowerBook Duo 250	PowerBook Duo	May 16, 1994
October 21, 1993	PowerBook Duo 270c	PowerBook Duo	May 16, 1994
October 21, 1993	Apple Color Plus 14″ Display	Displays	August 7, 1995

==== 1994 ====
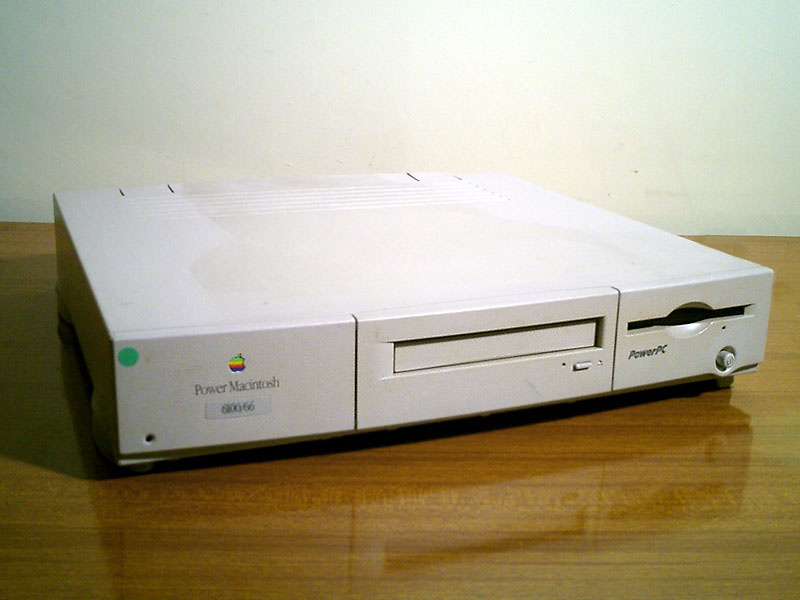
Power Macintosh 6100

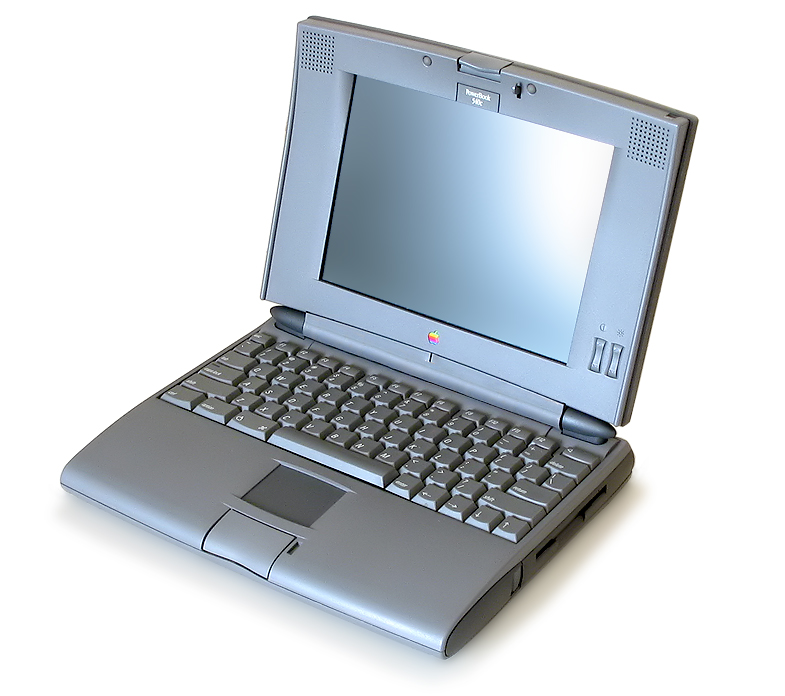
PowerBook 540c

Released	Model	Family	Discontinued
February 1, 1994	Macintosh LC 550	Macintosh LC	March 23, 1995
February 1, 1994	Macintosh LC 575	Macintosh LC	April 3, 1995
February 1, 1994	Color StyleWriter Pro	StyleWriter	December 16, 1995
February 1, 1994	Apple QuickTake 100	QuickTake	January 1, 1995
February 28, 1994	Quadra 610 DOS Compatible	Quadra	June 13, 1994
March 14, 1994	Power Macintosh 6100	Power Macintosh	May 18, 1996
March 14, 1994	Power Macintosh 7100	Power Macintosh	January 6, 1996
March 14, 1994	Power Macintosh 8100	Power Macintosh	January 3, 1995
April 25, 1994	Workgroup Server 6150	Workgroup Server	October 1, 1995
April 25, 1994	Workgroup Server 8150	Workgroup Server	February 26, 1996
April 25, 1994	Workgroup Server 9150	Workgroup Server	February 26, 1996
May 16, 1994	PowerBook 520c	PowerBook 500	September 16, 1995
May 16, 1994	PowerBook 540c	PowerBook 500	August 16, 1995
May 16, 1994	PowerBook 550	PowerBook 500	April 1, 1996
May 16, 1994	PowerBook Duo 280	PowerBook Duo	November 14, 1994
May 16, 1994	PowerBook Duo 280c	PowerBook Duo	January 1, 1996
May 16, 1994	PowerBook Duo Dock II	PowerBook Duo	May 25, 1995
July 18, 1994	Quadra 630	Quadra	April 17, 1995
July 18, 1994	PowerBook 150	PowerBook 100	October 14, 1995
July 18, 1994	Apple Multiple Scan 15 Display	Displays	September 14, 1996
September 1, 1994	Color StyleWriter 2400	StyleWriter	[?]
September 1, 1994	LaserWriter 16/600 PS	LaserWriter	[?]
November 3, 1994	Macintosh LC 630	Macintosh LC	March 2, 1996
December 1, 1994	Pippin	Pippin	December 1, 1997

==== 1995 ====
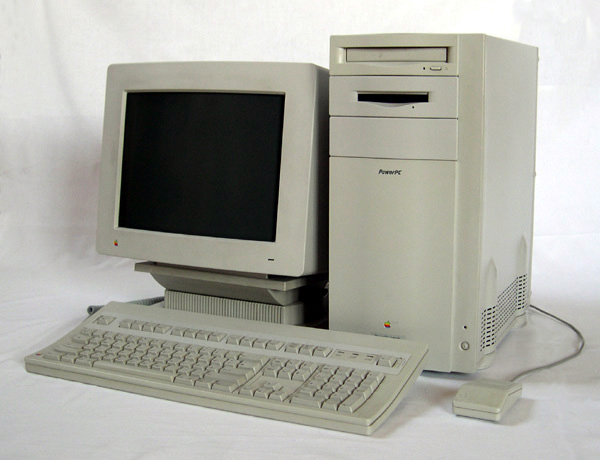
Power Macintosh 9500

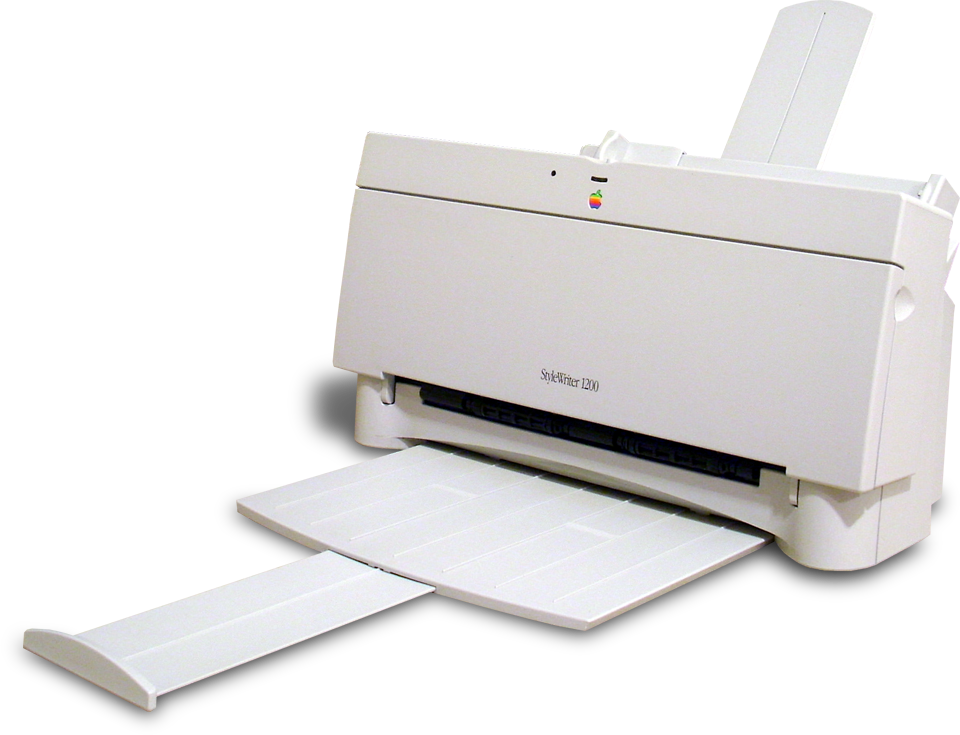
Apple StyleWriter 1200

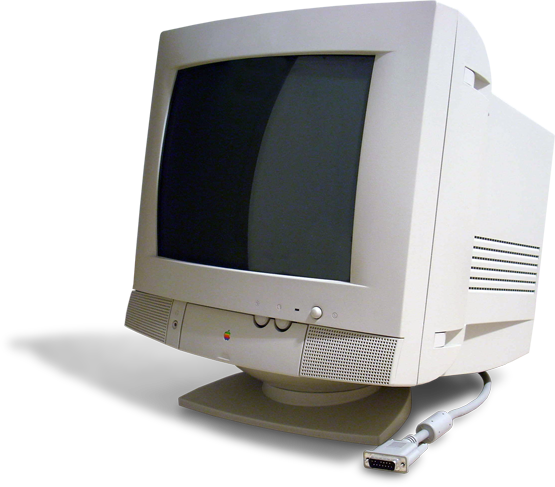
Apple Multiple Scan 14-inch Display

Released	Model	Family	Discontinued
February 23, 1995	Power Macintosh 8115	Power Macintosh	[?]
April 1, 1995	StyleWriter 1200	StyleWriter	[?]
April 3, 1995	Macintosh LC 580	Macintosh LC	October 1, 1995
April 3, 1995	Power Macintosh 5200 LC	Power Macintosh	October 1, 1996
May 1, 1995	Power Macintosh 6200/6300	Power Macintosh	July 1, 1997
May 15, 1995	PowerBook Duo Dock Plus	PowerBook Duo	[?]
June 1, 1995	LaserWriter 4/600 PS	LaserWriter	[?]
June 1, 1995	Color LaserWriter 12/600	LaserWriter	[?]
June 1, 1995	Color StyleWriter 2200	StyleWriter	[?]
June 19, 1995	Power Macintosh 9500	Power Macintosh	February 17, 1997
August 7, 1995	Power Macintosh 7200	Power Macintosh	April 1, 1996
August 7, 1995	Power Macintosh 7500	Power Macintosh	February 17, 1997
August 7, 1995	Power Macintosh 8500	Power Macintosh	February 17, 1997
August 7, 1995	AppleVision 1710	Displays	August 5, 1997
August 7, 1995	Apple Multiple Scan 14 Display	Displays	September 14, 1996
August 28, 1995	PowerBook 190	PowerBook 100	September 1, 1996
August 28, 1995	PowerBook 5300	PowerBook 500	September 1, 1996
August 28, 1995	Power Macintosh 5300 LC	Power Macintosh	March 1, 1997
August 28, 1995	PowerBook Duo 2300c	PowerBook Duo	February 1, 1997

==== 1996 ====
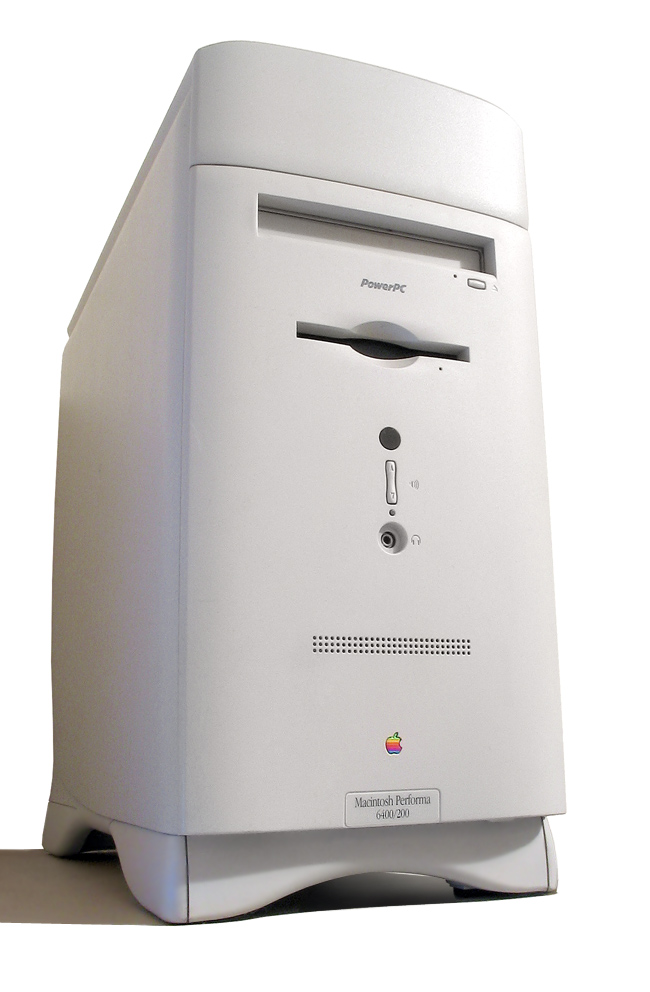
Power Macintosh 6400

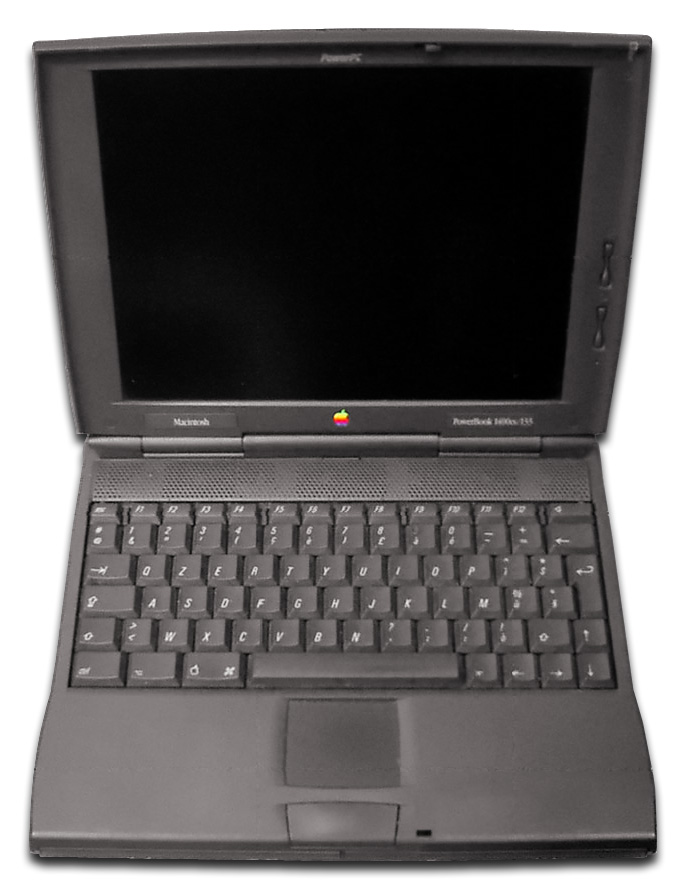
PowerBook 1400

Released	Model	Family	Discontinued
January 11, 1996	Power Macintosh 7215	Power Macintosh	[?]
January 11, 1996	Power Macintosh 8515	Power Macintosh	April 1, 1996
February 15, 1996	Apple Network Server 500	Network Server	April 1, 1997
February 15, 1996	Apple Network Server 700/150	Network Server	April 1, 1997
February 17, 1996	Power Macintosh 5400	Power Macintosh	March 1, 1998
February 19, 1996	Color StyleWriter 1500	StyleWriter	[?]
February 19, 1996	Color StyleWriter 2500	StyleWriter	[?]
February 26, 1996	Workgroup Server 7250	Workgroup Server	April 21, 1997
February 26, 1996	Workgroup Server 8550	Workgroup Server	April 21, 1997
April 1, 1996	Power Macintosh 7600	Power Macintosh	October 1, 1997
April 15, 1996	Power Macintosh 5260	Power Macintosh	March 1, 1997
April 22, 1996	Power Macintosh 7200/120 PC Compatible	Power Macintosh	February 1, 1997
April 22, 1996	Power Macintosh 8200	Power Macintosh	September 19, 1996
May 1, 1996	LaserWriter 12/640PS	LaserWriter	[?]
June 27, 1996	Power Macintosh 6300	Power Macintosh	July 1, 1997
October 1, 1996	Power Macintosh 6400	Power Macintosh	May 1, 1997
October 1, 1996	Color LaserWriter 12/660 PS	LaserWriter	[?]
October 16, 1996	Apple Network Server 700/200	Network Server	April 1, 1997
November 15, 1996	Power Macintosh 4400	Power Macintosh	October 11, 1997
November 20, 1996	PowerBook 1400	PowerBook	May 6, 1998

==== 1997 ====
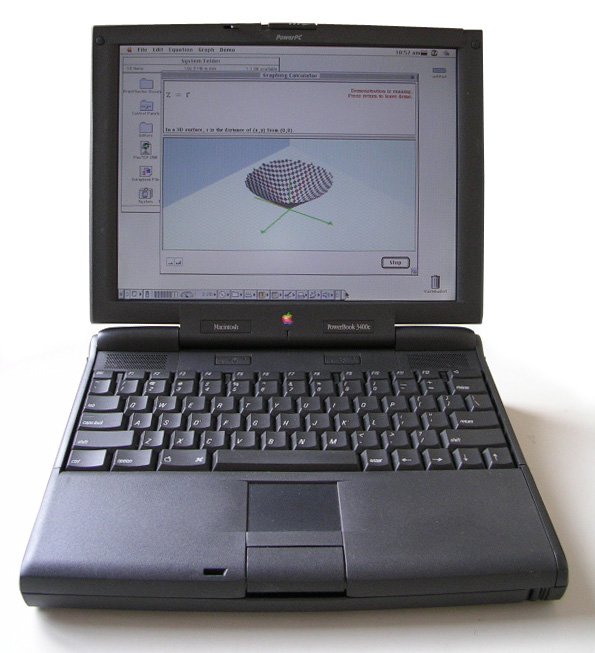
PowerBook 3400

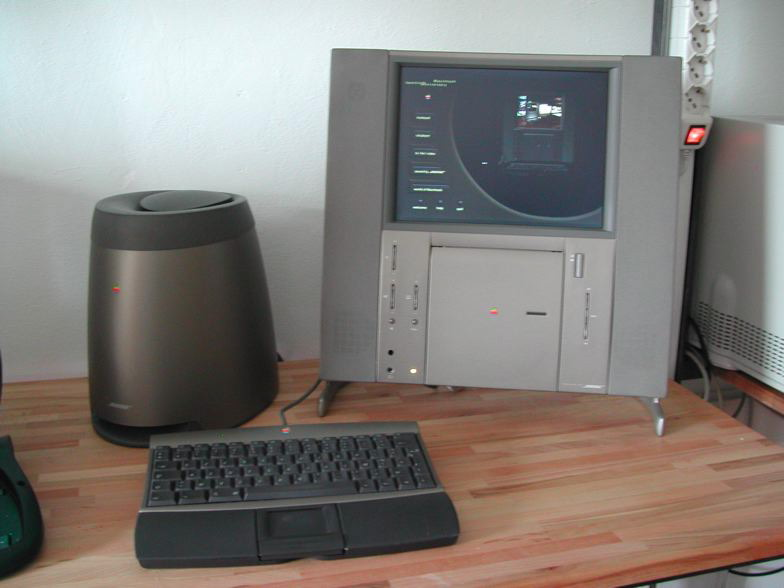
Twentieth Anniversary Macintosh

Released	Model	Family	Discontinued
February 17, 1997	Power Macintosh 5500	Power Macintosh	March 31, 1998
February 17, 1997	Power Macintosh 6500	Power Macintosh	March 14, 1998
February 17, 1997	Power Macintosh 7220	Power Macintosh	[?]
February 17, 1997	Power Macintosh 7300	Power Macintosh	November 10, 1997
February 17, 1997	Power Macintosh 8600	Power Macintosh	February 17, 1998
February 17, 1997	Power Macintosh 9600	Power Macintosh	March 17, 1998
February 17, 1997	PowerBook 3400	PowerBook	March 14, 1998
March 7, 1997	eMate 300	Newton	February 27, 1998
March 20, 1997	Twentieth Anniversary Macintosh	Power Macintosh	March 14, 1998
April 21, 1997	Workgroup Server 7350	Workgroup Server	March 2, 1998
April 21, 1997	Workgroup Server 9650	Workgroup Server	March 2, 1998
May 8, 1997	PowerBook 2400c	PowerBook	March 14, 1998
June 16, 1997	Color StyleWriter 4100	StyleWriter	[?]
June 16, 1997	Color StyleWriter 4500	StyleWriter	[?]
June 16, 1997	Color StyleWriter 6500	StyleWriter	[?]
August 5, 1997	LaserWriter 8500	LaserWriter	[?]
August 5, 1997	Apple ColorSync/AppleVision 750 Display	Displays	November 10, 1998
November 10, 1997	Power Macintosh G3 desktop	Power Macintosh	January 5, 1999
November 10, 1997	Power Macintosh G3 minitower	Power Macintosh	January 5, 1999
November 10, 1997	PowerBook G3	PowerBook G3	March 14, 1998

==== 1998 ====
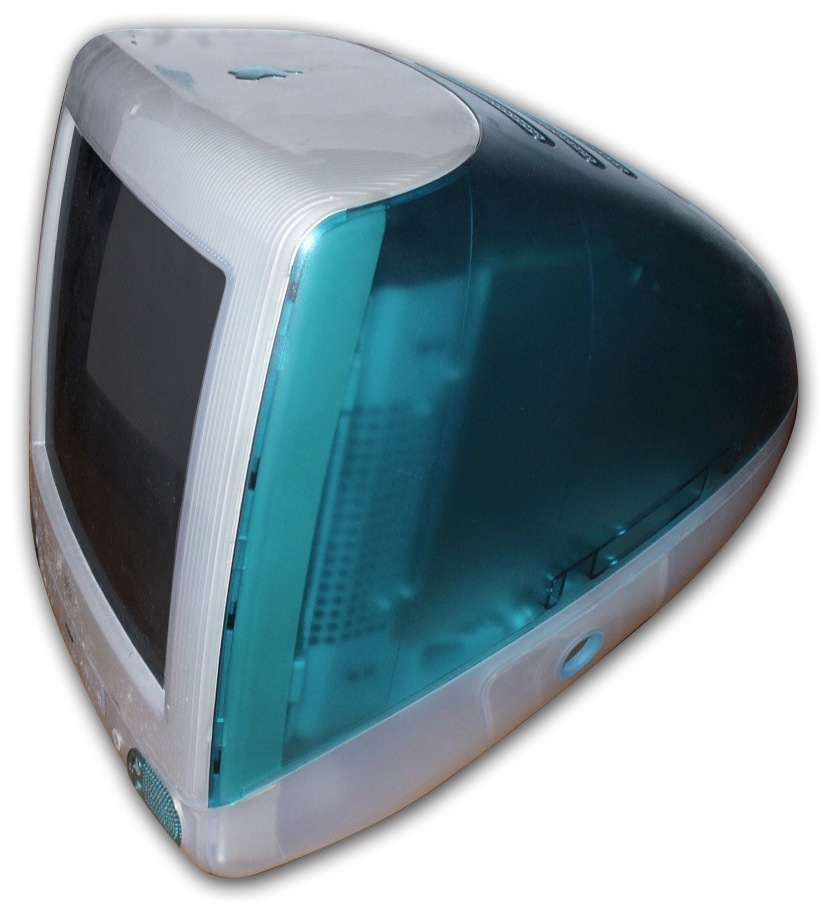
iMac G3

Released	Model	Family	Discontinued
January 31, 1998	Power Macintosh G3 AIO	Power Macintosh	October 17, 1998
March 2, 1998	Macintosh Server G3	Macintosh Server	January 1, 1999
March 17, 1998	Apple Studio Display	Displays	June 1, 2004
May 6, 1998	PowerBook G3 series	PowerBook G3	May 10, 1999
August 15, 1998	iMac G3	iMac	May 10, 1999

==== 1999 ====
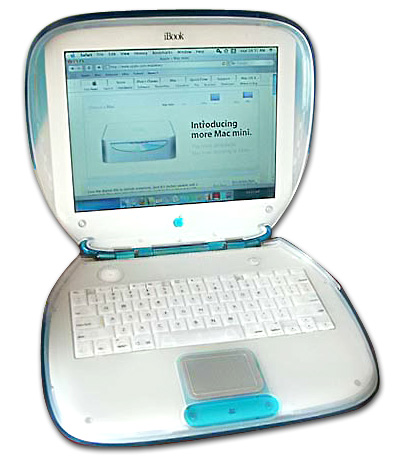
iBook, released July 21, 1999

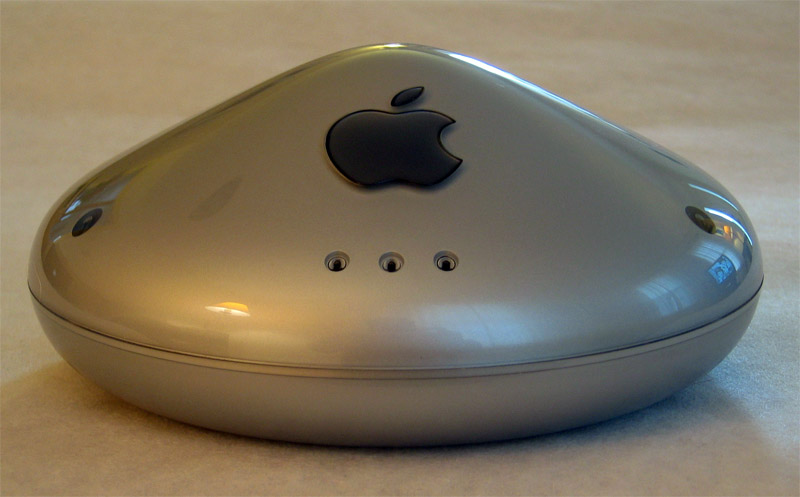
AirPort (802.11b, "Graphite"), released July 21, 1999

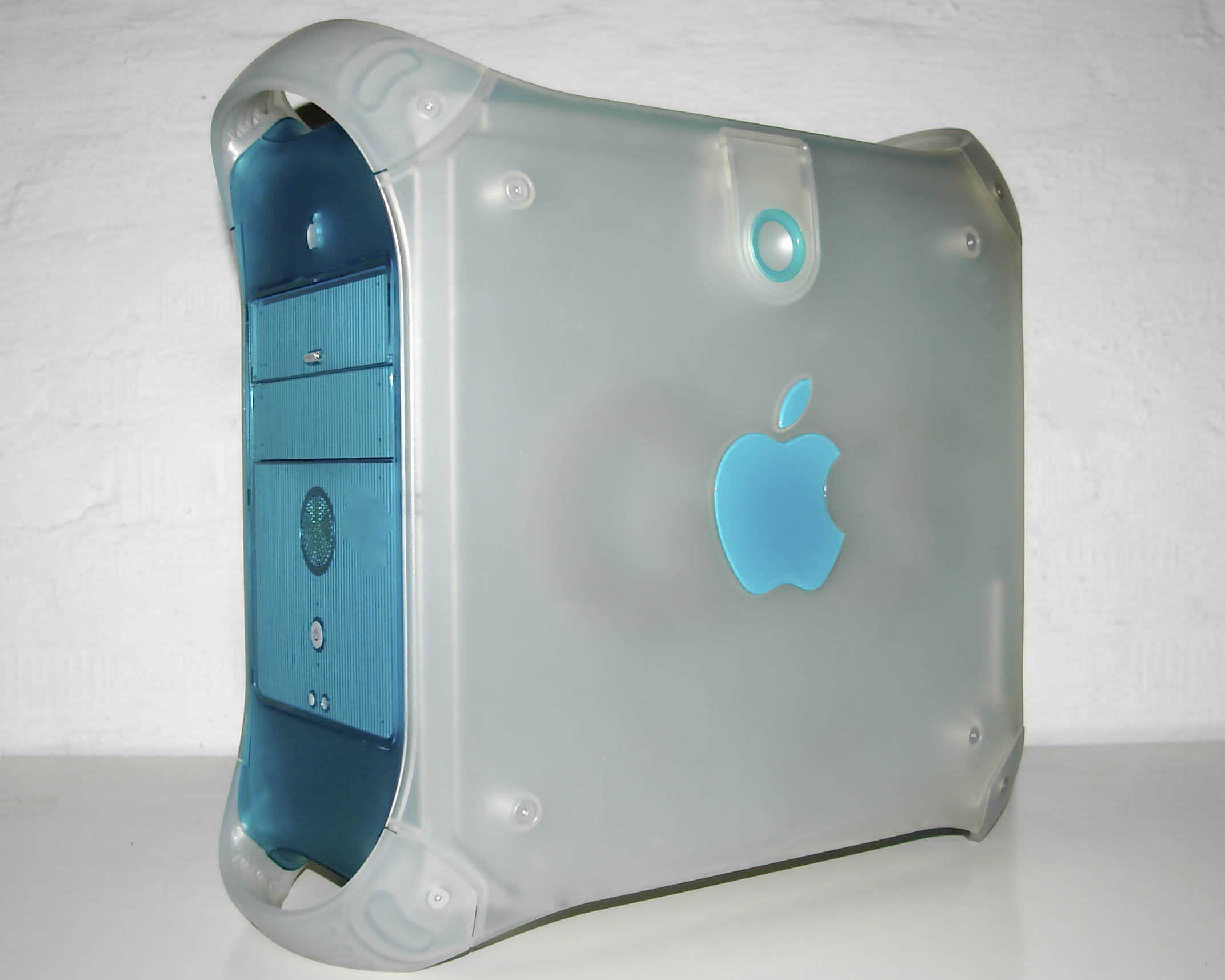
Power Macintosh G3 (Blue & White), released January 5, 1999

Released	Model	Family	Discontinued
January 5, 1999	Power Macintosh G3 (Blue & White)	Power Macintosh	October 13, 1999
January 5, 1999	Macintosh Server G3 (Blue & White)	Macintosh Server	August 31, 1999
May 10, 1999	PowerBook G3 ("Lombard")	PowerBook G3	February 16, 2000
July 21, 1999	iBook G3	iBook	September 13, 2000
July 21, 1999	AirPort (802.11b, "Graphite")	AirPort	November 13, 2001
August 31, 1999	Macintosh Server G4	Macintosh Server	July 19, 2000
September 1, 1999	Cinema Display (22")	Displays	July 19, 2000
October 5, 1999	iMac (slot loading)	iMac	January 7, 2002
October 13, 1999	Power Mac G4 Graphite	Power Macintosh	July 18, 2001

=== 2000s ===
==== 2000 ====
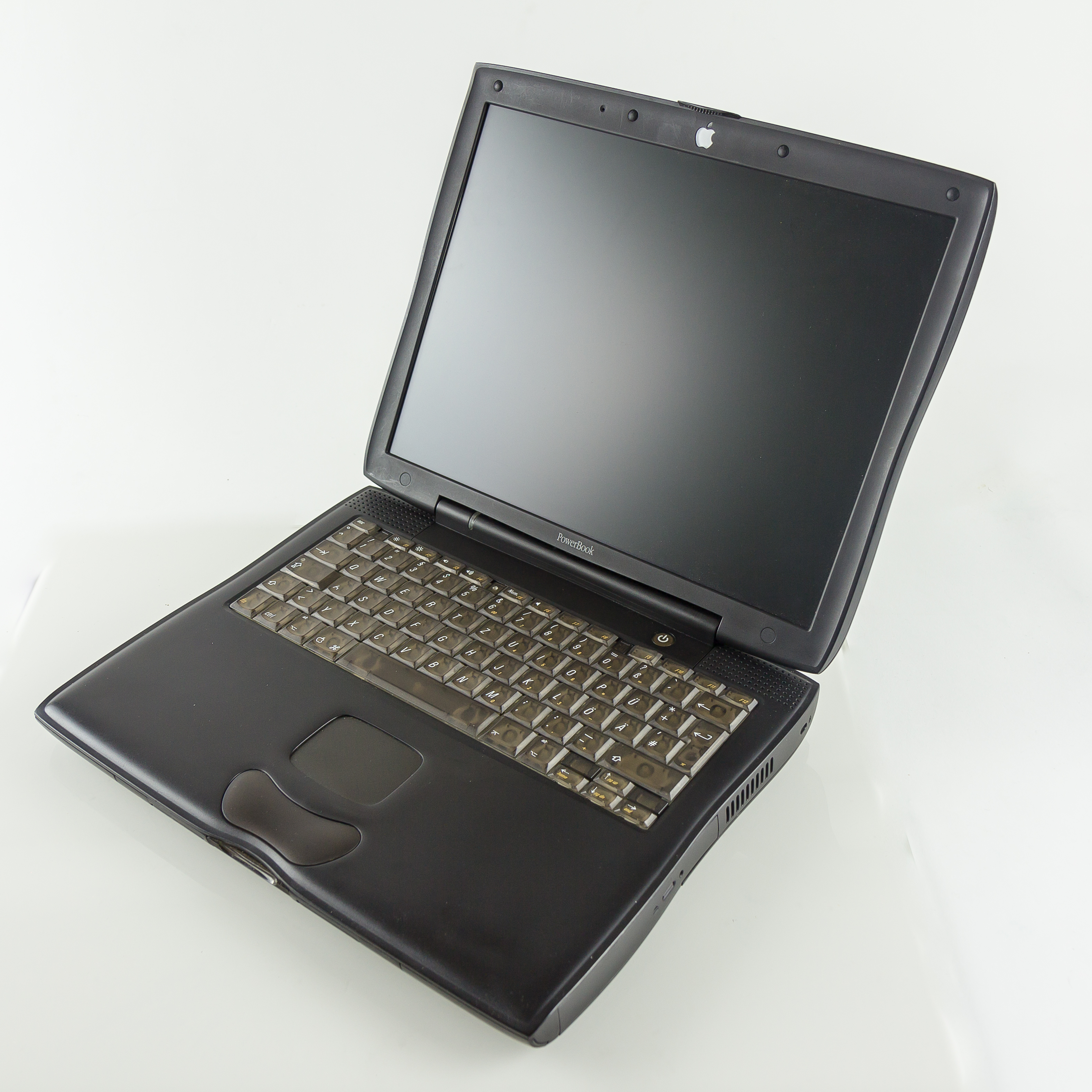
"Pismo" PowerBook, released February 16, 2000

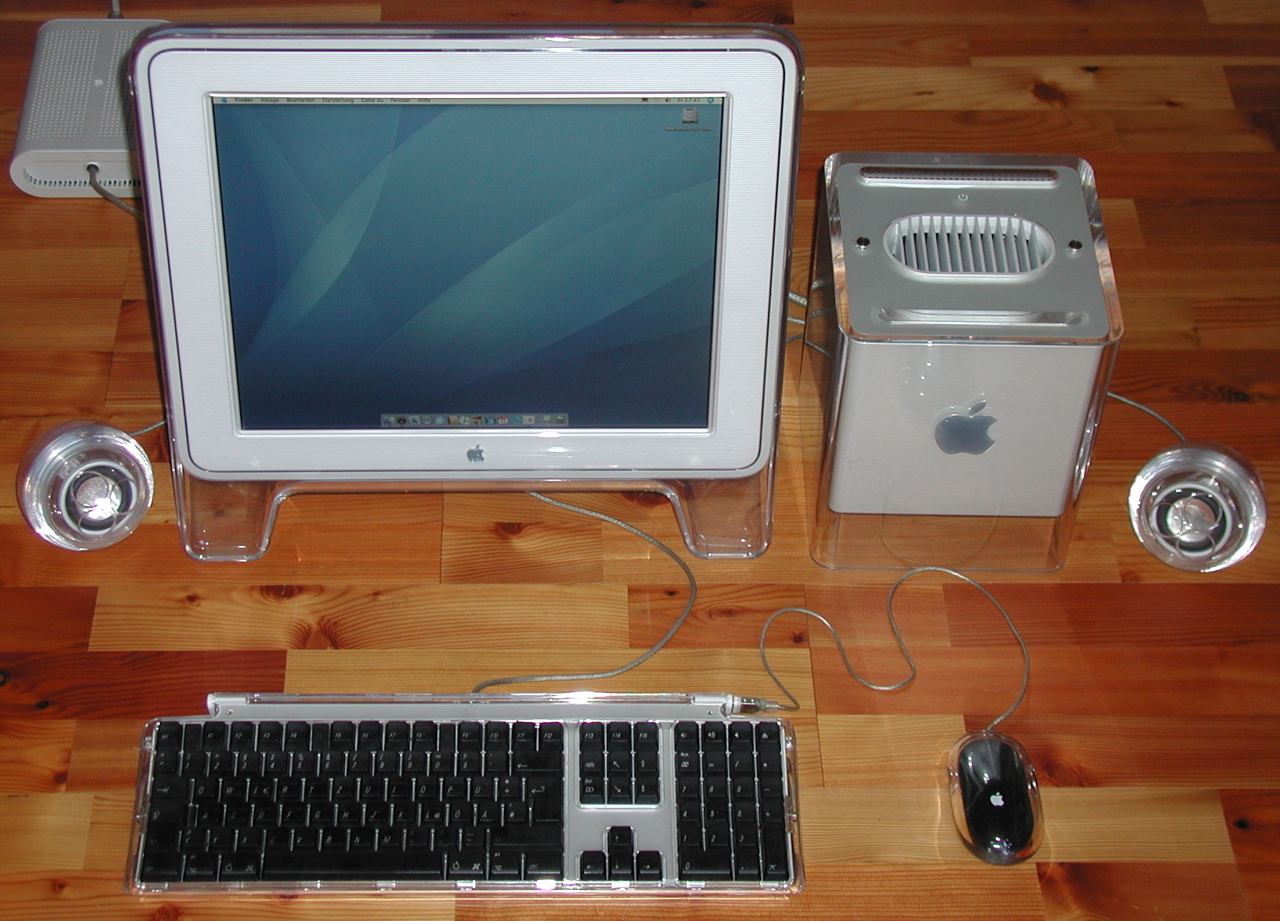
Cinema Display (22-inch, ADC) on the left, and Power Mac G4 Cube on the right, released July 19, 2000, with Apple Pro Speakers on the sides

Released	Model	Family	Discontinued
February 16, 2000	PowerBook ("Pismo")	PowerBook G3	January 9, 2001
July 19, 2000	Power Mac G4 Cube	Power Macintosh	July 3, 2001
July 19, 2000	Cinema Display (22") (ADC)	Displays	January 28, 2003
July 19, 2000	Apple Pro Speakers (USB)	Speakers	January 9, 2001
September 13, 2000	iBook (FireWire)	iBook	May 1, 2001

==== 2001 ====
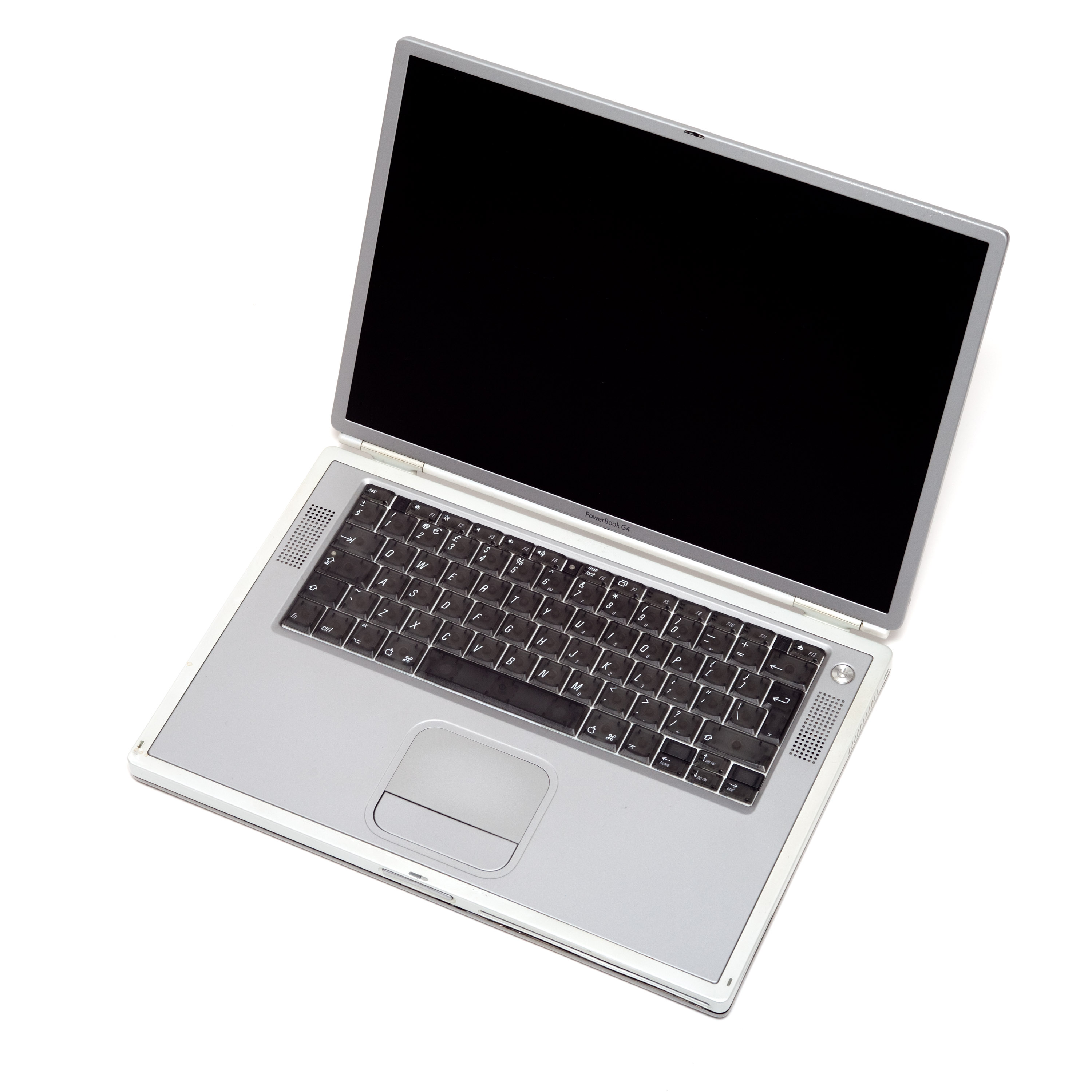
PowerBook G4 Titanium, released January 9, 2001

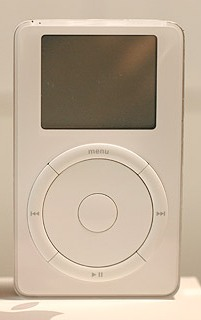
iPod, released November 10, 2001

Released	Model	Family	Discontinued
January 9, 2001	PowerBook G4 Titanium	PowerBook G4	September 16, 2003
January 9, 2001	Power Mac G4 Digital Audio	Power Macintosh	July 18, 2001
January 9, 2001	Apple Pro Speakers (minijack)	Speakers	2004
May 1, 2001	iBook (white)	iBook	October 22, 2003
July 18, 2001	Power Mac G4 Quicksilver	Power Macintosh	August 13, 2002
September 8, 2001	Server G4 Quicksilver	Macintosh Server	May 14, 2002
November 10, 2001	iPod (1st gen)	iPod Classic	July 17, 2002

==== 2002 ====
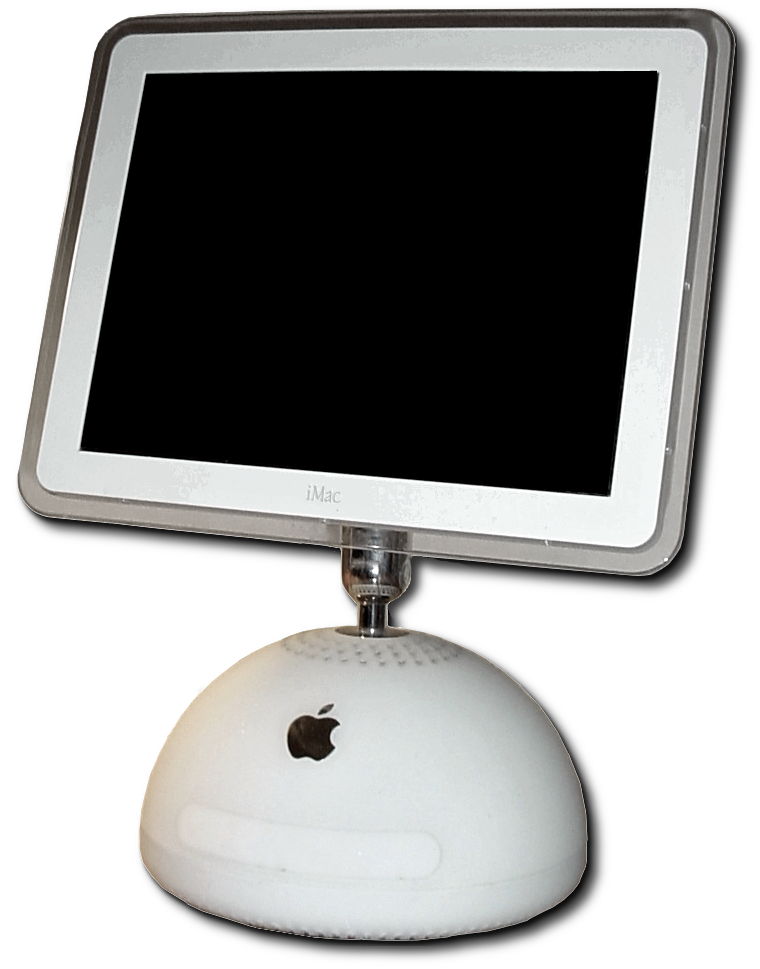
iMac G4

Released	Model	Family	Discontinued
January 7, 2002	iMac G4 15"	iMac	August 31, 2004
January 7, 2002	iBook (14")	iBook	October 22, 2003
April 29, 2002	eMac	eMac	July 5, 2006
May 14, 2002	Xserve	Xserve	February 10, 2003
August 1, 2002	iMac G4 17"	iMac	August 31, 2004
August 1, 2002	iPod (2nd gen)	iPod Classic	April 28, 2003
August 13, 2002	Power Mac G4 MDD	Power Macintosh	June 9, 2004
August 27, 2002	Macintosh Server G4 MDD	Macintosh Server	January 28, 2003

==== 2003 ====
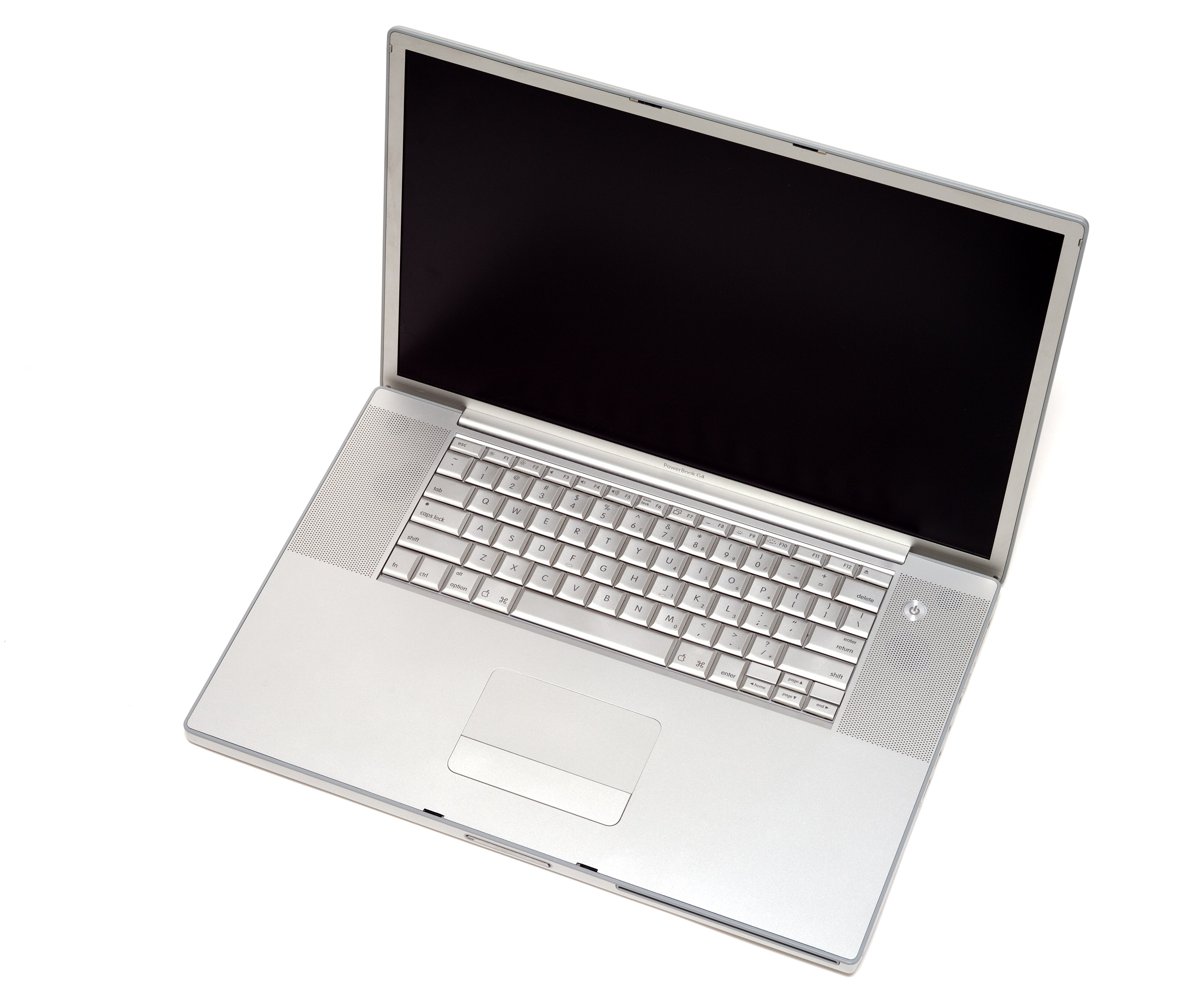
17-inch PowerBook G4

Released	Model	Family	Discontinued
January 7, 2003	PowerBook G4 Aluminum (12")	PowerBook G4	May 16, 2006
January 7, 2003	PowerBook G4 Aluminum (17")	PowerBook G4	April 24, 2006
January 7, 2003	AirPort Extreme (1st generation)	AirPort Extreme	[?]
February 10, 2003	Xserve slot loading	Xserve	January 6, 2004
February 10, 2003	Xserve Cluster Node	Xserve	January 6, 2004
February 10, 2003	Xserve RAID	Xserve	February 19, 2008
May 2, 2003	iPod (3rd gen)	iPod Classic	July 19, 2004
June 23, 2003	Power Mac G5	Power Macintosh	June 9, 2004
September 16, 2003	PowerBook G4 Aluminum (15")	PowerBook G4	February 14, 2006
October 22, 2003	iBook G4 (12" / 14")	iBook	May 16, 2006
November 18, 2003	iMac G4 20"	iMac	August 31, 2004

==== 2004 ====
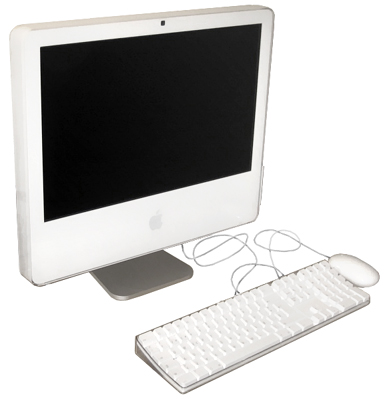
iMac G5

Released	Model	Family	Discontinued
January 6, 2004	Xserve G5	Xserve	August 7, 2006
January 6, 2004	Xserve Cluster Node G5	Xserve	August 7, 2006
January 6, 2004	iPod In-Ear Headphones	Headphones	June 25, 2009
January 8, 2004	iPod+HP	iPod Classic	July 29, 2005
February 20, 2004	iPod Mini (1st gen)	iPod Mini	February 23, 2005
June 7, 2004	AirPort Express (802.11g)	AirPort Express	March 17, 2008
June 9, 2004	Power Mac G5 FX	Power Macintosh	October 19, 2005
June 28, 2004	Cinema Display (20")	Displays	February 1, 2009
June 28, 2004	Cinema Display (23")	Displays	November 1, 2008
June 28, 2004	Cinema Display (30")	Displays	July 27, 2010
July 19, 2004	iPod (4th gen)	iPod Classic	October 1, 2005
August 31, 2004	iMac G5 17"	iMac	January 10, 2006
August 31, 2004	iMac G5 20"	iMac	March 20, 2006
October 26, 2004	iPod Photo	iPod Classic	June 28, 2005

==== 2005 ====
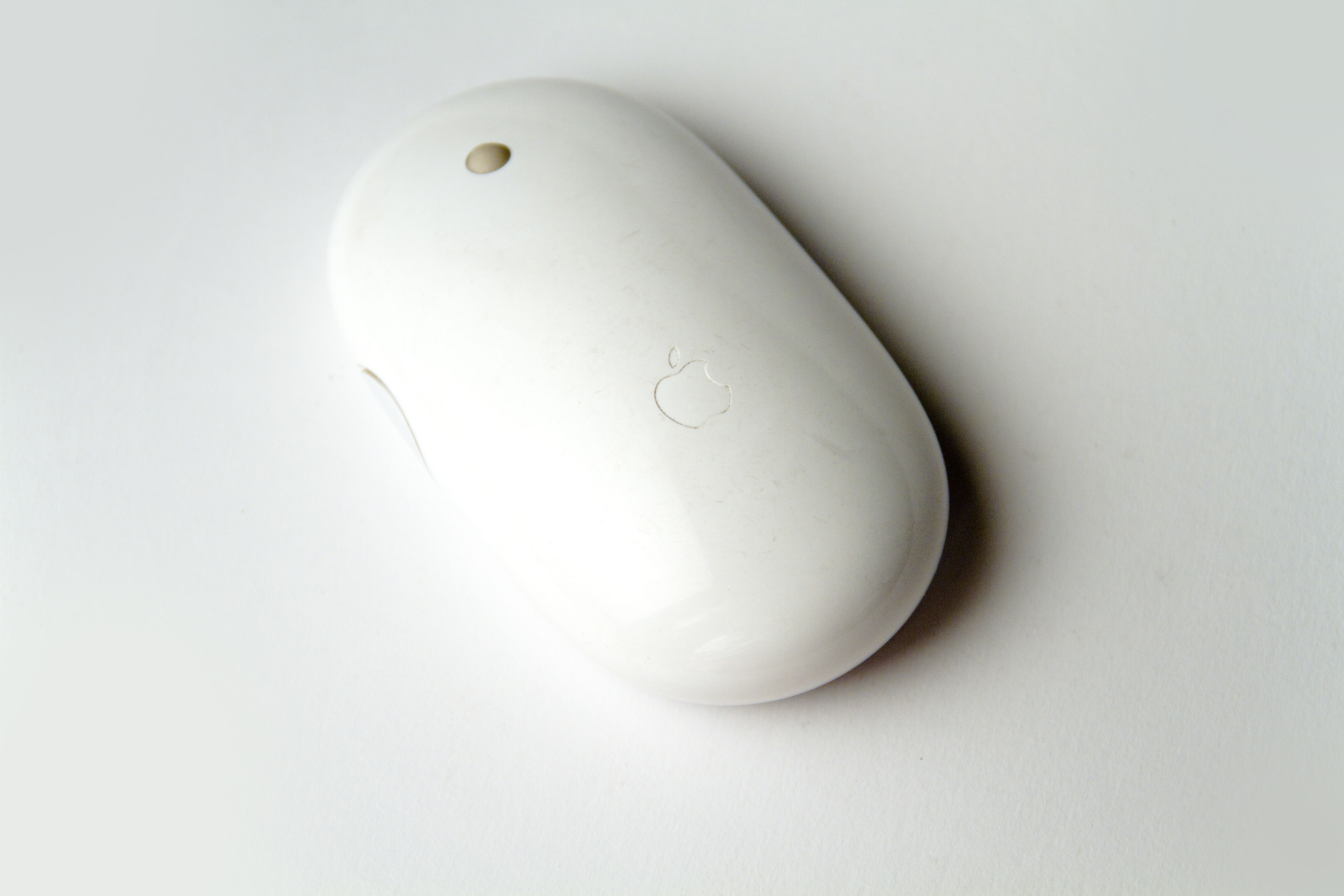
Apple Mighty Mouse (wireless version shown), released August 2, 2005

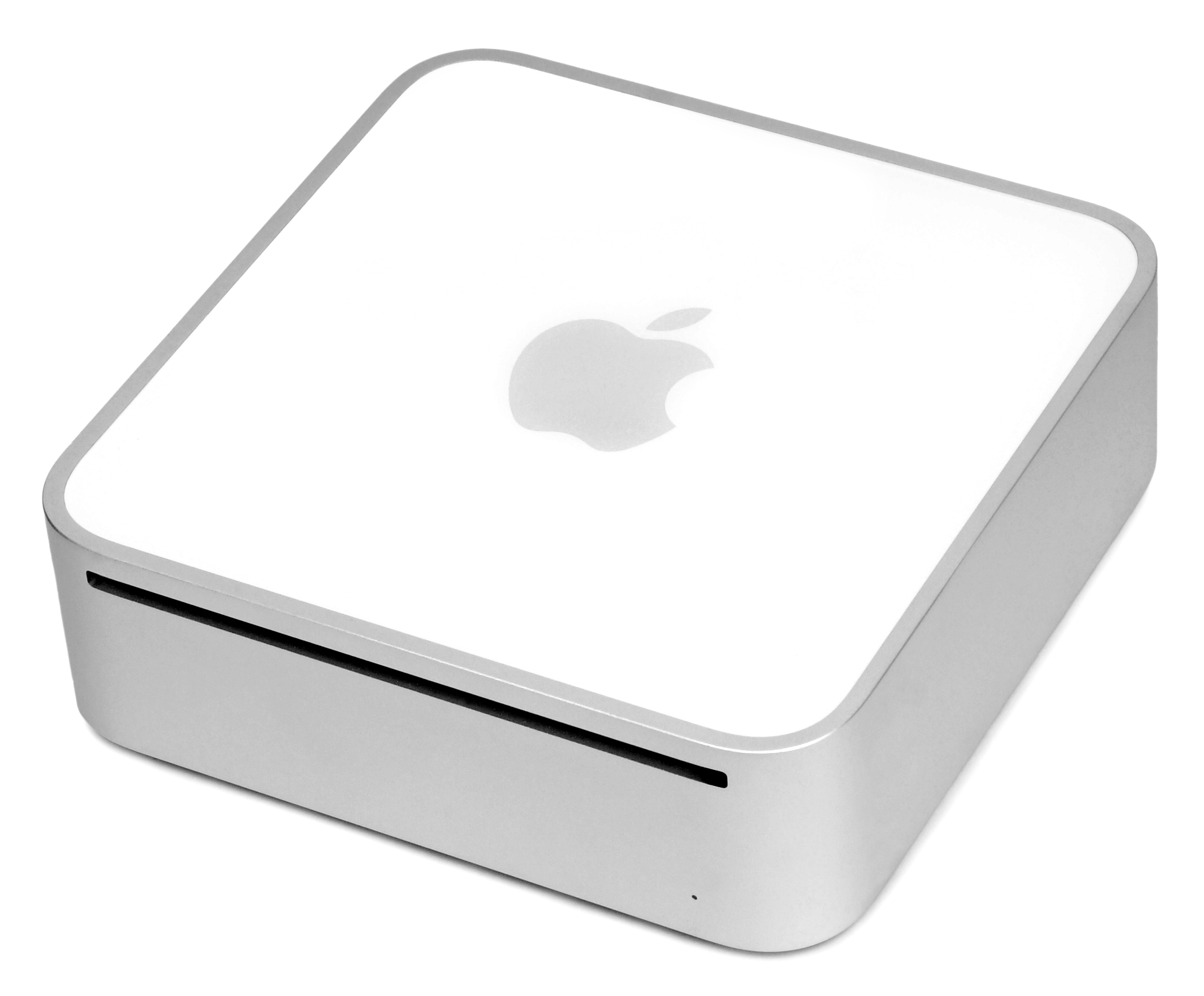
Mac Mini, released January 11, 2005

Released	Model	Family	Discontinued
January 11, 2005	Mac Mini	Mac Mini	February 28, 2006
January 11, 2005	iPod Shuffle (1st gen)	iPod Shuffle	September 12, 2006
February 23, 2005	iPod Mini (2nd gen)	iPod Mini	September 7, 2005
August 2, 2005	Apple Mighty Mouse	Pointing devices	August 7, 2007
September 7, 2005	iPod Nano (1st gen)	iPod Nano	September 25, 2006
October 1, 2005	iPod (5th gen)	iPod Classic	September 5, 2007
October 19, 2005	Power Mac G5 dual core	Power Macintosh	August 7, 2006

==== 2006 ====
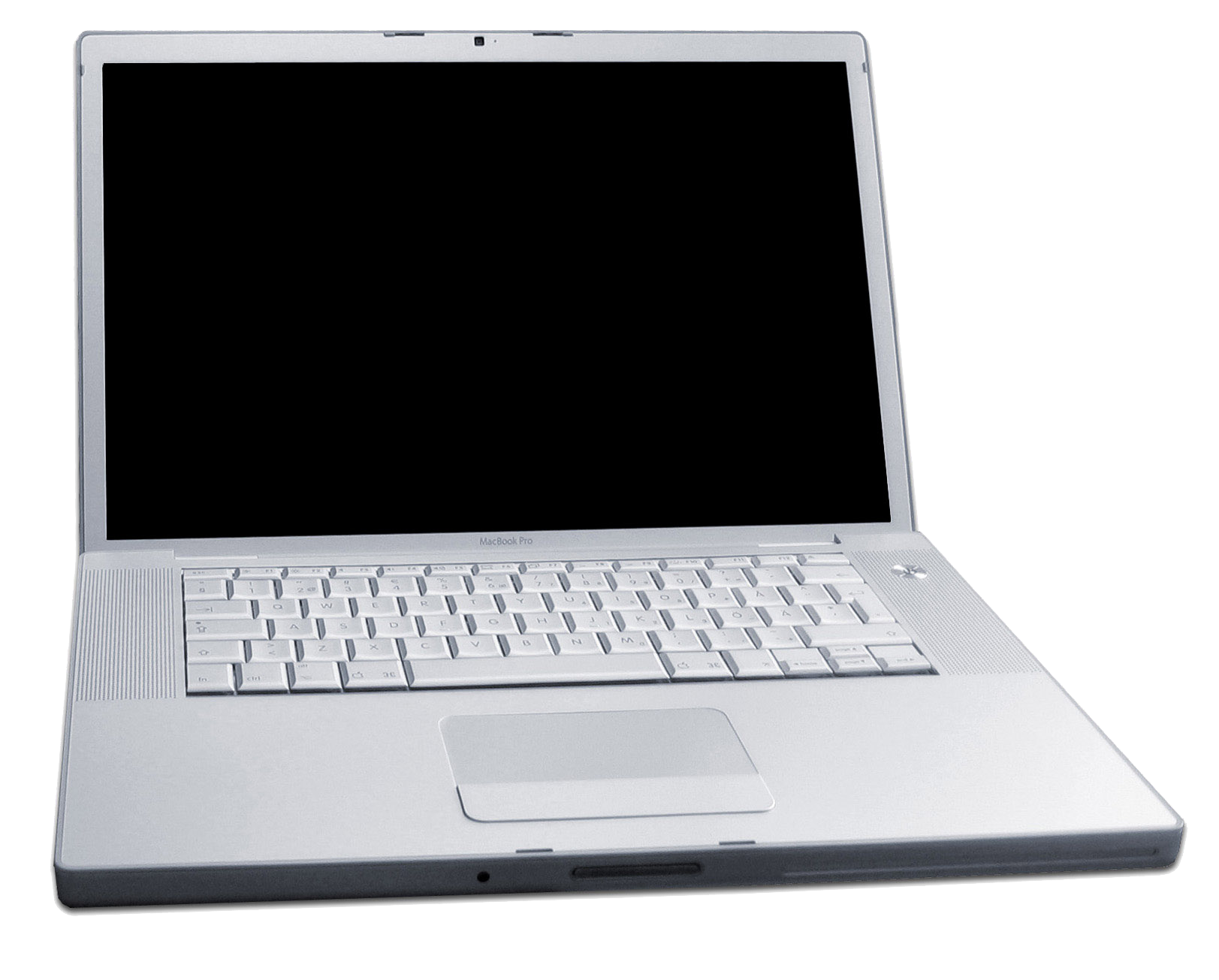
MacBook Pro Aluminum

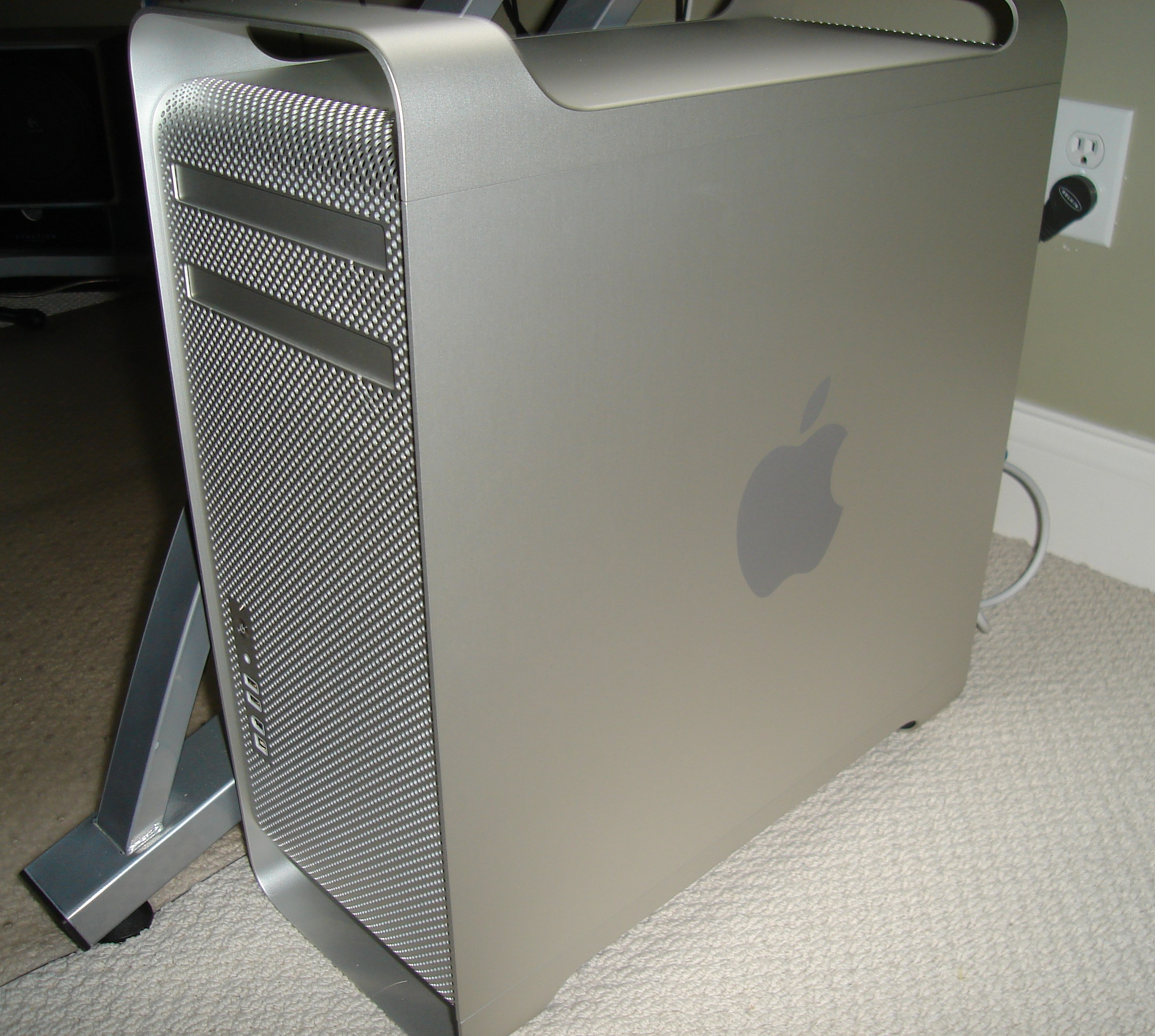
Mac Pro

Released	Model	Family	Discontinued
January 10, 2006	iMac (Early 2006)	iMac	September 6, 2006
January 10, 2006	iPod Radio Remote	iPod accessories	June 25, 2009
February 14, 2006	MacBook Pro (15")	MacBook Pro	February 26, 2008
February 28, 2006	Mac Mini Core Solo	Mac Mini	September 6, 2006
February 28, 2006	Mac Mini Core Duo	Mac Mini	August 7, 2007
February 28, 2006	iPod Hi-Fi	Speakers	September 5, 2007
April 24, 2006	MacBook Pro (17")	MacBook Pro	February 26, 2008
May 16, 2006	MacBook	MacBook	April 10, 2015
July 5, 2006	iMac (Mid 2006)	iMac	September 6, 2006
July 13, 2006	Nike+iPod	iPod accessories	2014
August 7, 2006	Mac Pro	Mac Pro	January 8, 2008
August 7, 2006	Xserve (Intel)	Xserve	January 8, 2008
September 6, 2006	iMac (Late 2006)	iMac	August 7, 2007
September 12, 2006	iPod Shuffle (2nd gen)	iPod Shuffle	March 11, 2009
September 25, 2006	iPod Nano (2nd gen)	iPod Nano	September 5, 2007
November 8, 2006	MacBook (Late 2006)	MacBook	May 15, 2007

==== 2007 ====
iPhone
(1st generation)

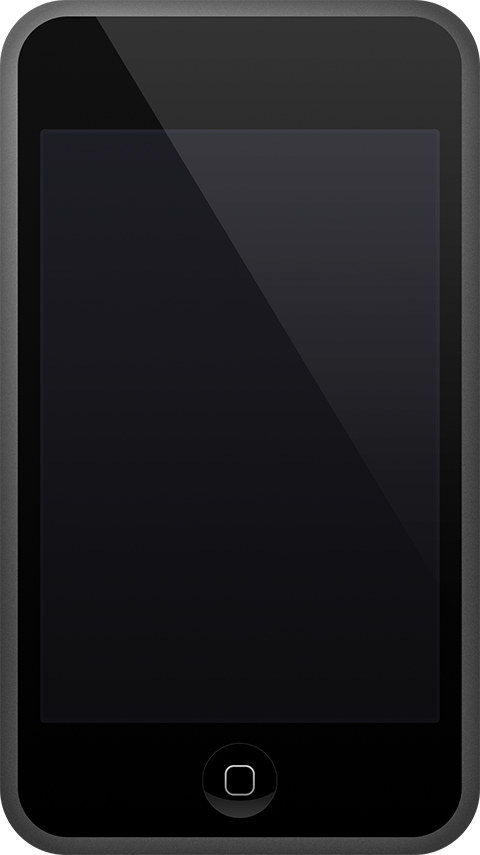
iPod Touch
(1st generation)

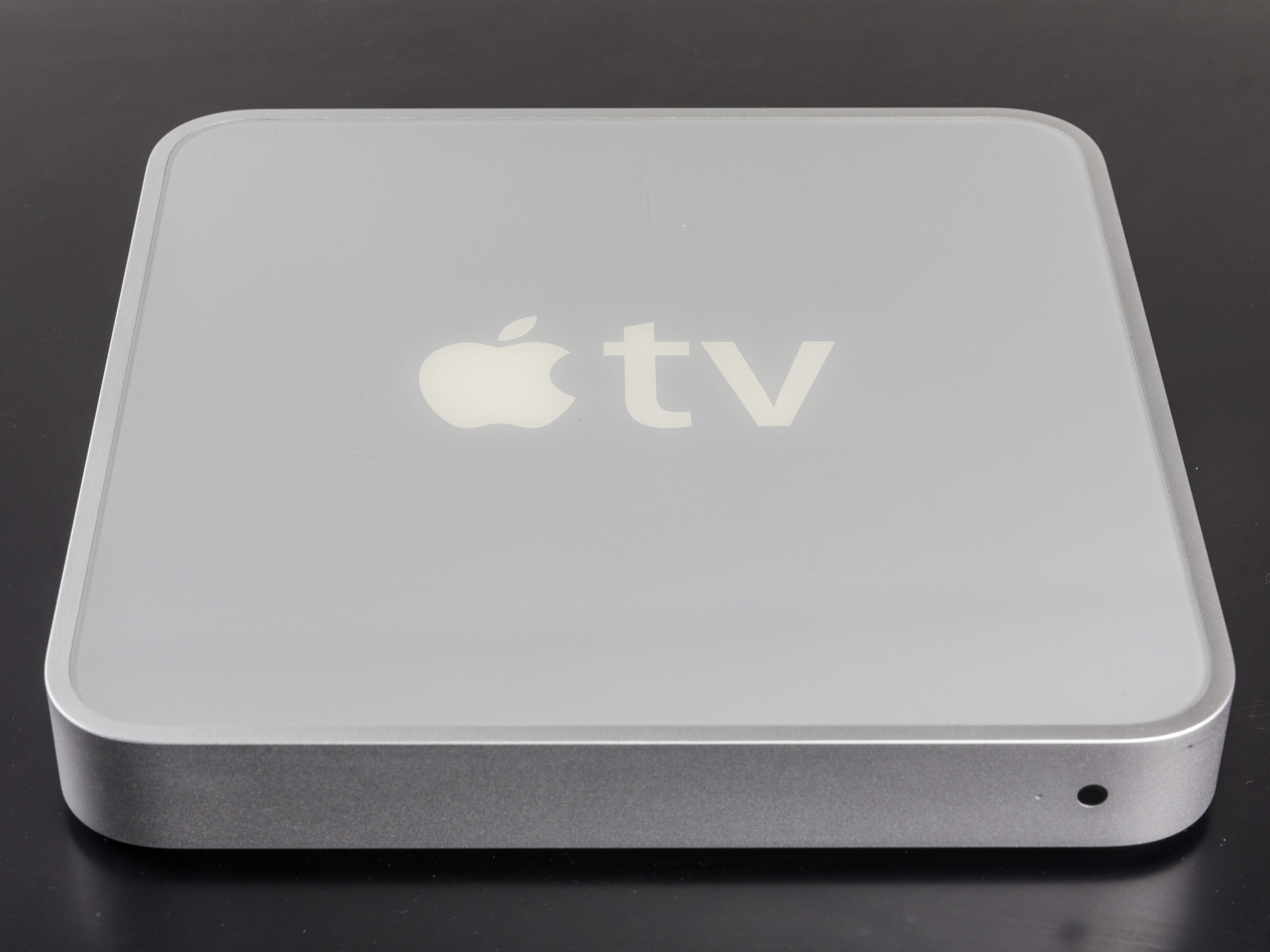
Apple TV
(1st generation)

Released	Model	Family	Discontinued
January 9, 2007	Apple TV (1st generation)	Apple TV	September 1, 2010
May 15, 2007	MacBook (Mid 2007)	MacBook	November 1, 2007
June 29, 2007	iPhone (1st generation) (4 GB)	iPhone	September 5, 2007
June 29, 2007	iPhone (1st generation) (8 GB)	iPhone	July 11, 2008
June 29, 2007	iPhone Bluetooth Headset	Headphones	March 23, 2009
August 7, 2007	iMac (Mid 2007)	iMac	April 28, 2008
August 7, 2007	Apple Mighty Mouse (revised)	Pointing devices	June 5, 2017
August 7, 2007	Apple Keyboard with Numeric Keypad	Keyboards	June 5, 2017
August 7, 2007	Apple Wireless Keyboard (Aluminum)	Keyboards	October 13, 2015
August 7, 2007	Mac Mini (Mid 2007)	Mac Mini	March 3, 2009
September 5, 2007	iPod Nano (3rd gen)	iPod Nano	September 6, 2008
September 5, 2007	iPod Classic (6th gen)	iPod Classic	September 9, 2008
September 5, 2007	iPod Touch (1st generation) (8 & 16 GB)	iPod Touch	September 9, 2008

==== 2008 ====
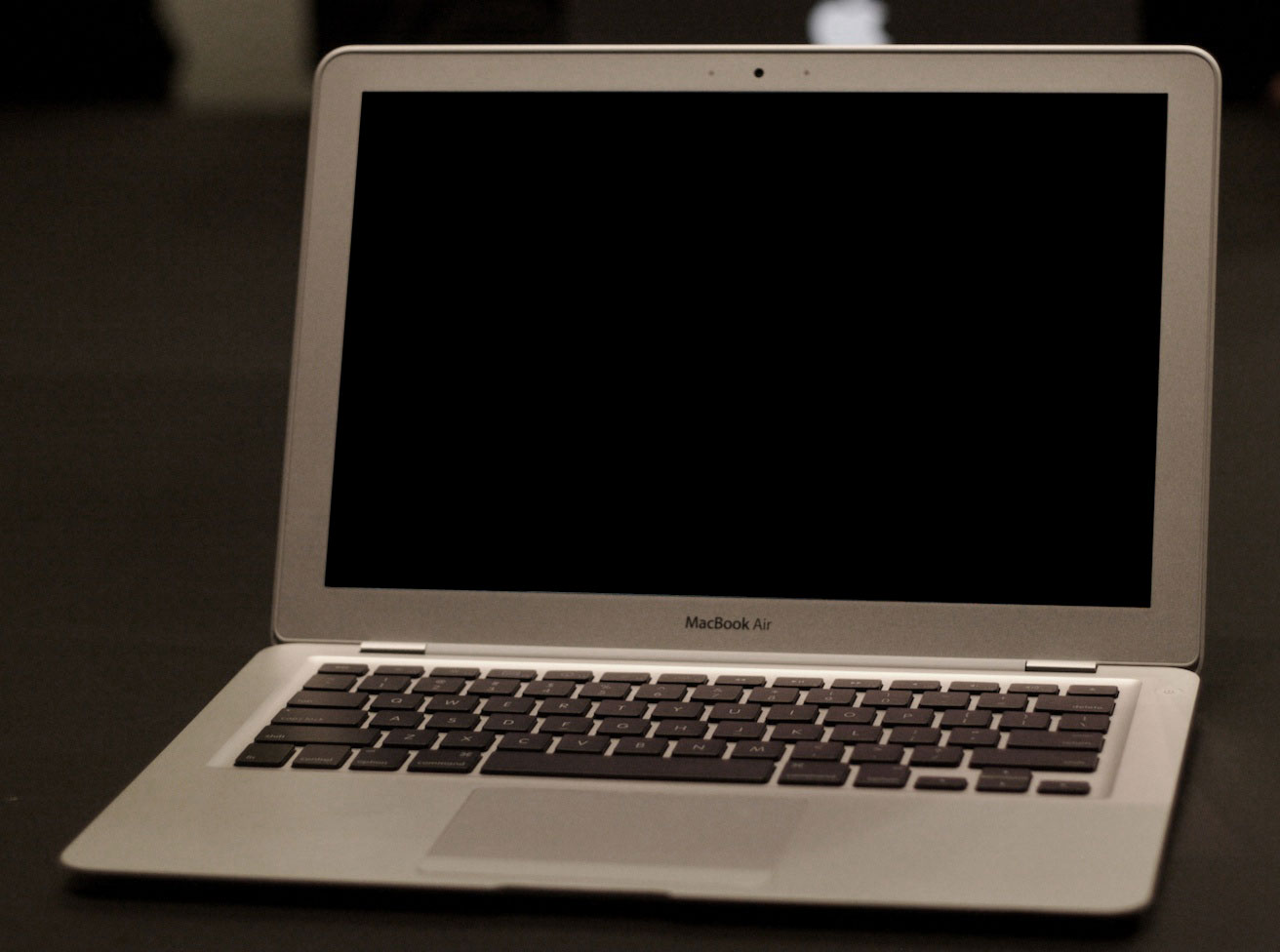
MacBook Air

Released	Model	Family	Discontinued
January 8, 2008	Xserve (Early 2008)	Xserve	April 7, 2009
January 8, 2008	Mac Pro (Early 2008)	Mac Pro	March 3, 2009
January 15, 2008	MacBook Air (Early 2008)	MacBook Air	October 14, 2008
January 15, 2008	USB SuperDrive (previously MacBook Air SuperDrive)	Drives	August 2024 (Note: The SuperDrive was last stocked in August 2024 but remained listed on Apple's online store until it was delisted in 2025.)
February 5, 2008	iPhone (1st generation) (16 GB)	iPhone	July 11, 2008
February 26, 2008	MacBook (Early 2008)	MacBook	October 14, 2008
February 26, 2008	MacBook Pro (Early 2008) (15")	MacBook Pro	October 14, 2008
February 26, 2008	MacBook Pro (Early 2008) (17")	MacBook Pro	January 6, 2009
February 27, 2008	iPod Touch (1st generation) (32 GB)	iPod Touch	September 9, 2008
February 29, 2008	Time Capsule (1st gen)	AirPort, drives	March 3, 2009
March 17, 2008	AirPort Express 802.11n (1st gen)	AirPort Express	June 11, 2012
April 28, 2008	iMac (Early 2008)	iMac	March 3, 2009
July 11, 2008	iPhone 3G (8 GB)	iPhone	June 7, 2010
July 11, 2008	iPhone 3G (16 GB)	iPhone	June 8, 2009
September 9, 2008	iPod Nano (4th gen)	iPod Nano	September 9, 2009
September 9, 2008	iPod Classic (6th gen) (120 GB)	iPod Classic	September 9, 2009
September 9, 2008	iPod Touch (2nd generation) (8 GB)	iPod Touch	September 1, 2010
September 9, 2008	iPod Touch (2nd generation) (16 & 32 GB)	iPod Touch	September 9, 2009
September 9, 2008	In-Ear Headphones	Headphones	2018
October 14, 2008	MacBook Air (Late 2008)	MacBook Air	June 8, 2009
October 14, 2008	MacBook (Late 2008) (White)	MacBook	January 29, 2009
October 14, 2008	MacBook (Late 2008) (Aluminum)	MacBook	June 8, 2009
October 14, 2008	MacBook Pro (Late 2008) (15")	MacBook Pro	June 8, 2009
October 14, 2008	LED Cinema Display (24")	Displays	July 27, 2010

==== 2009 ====
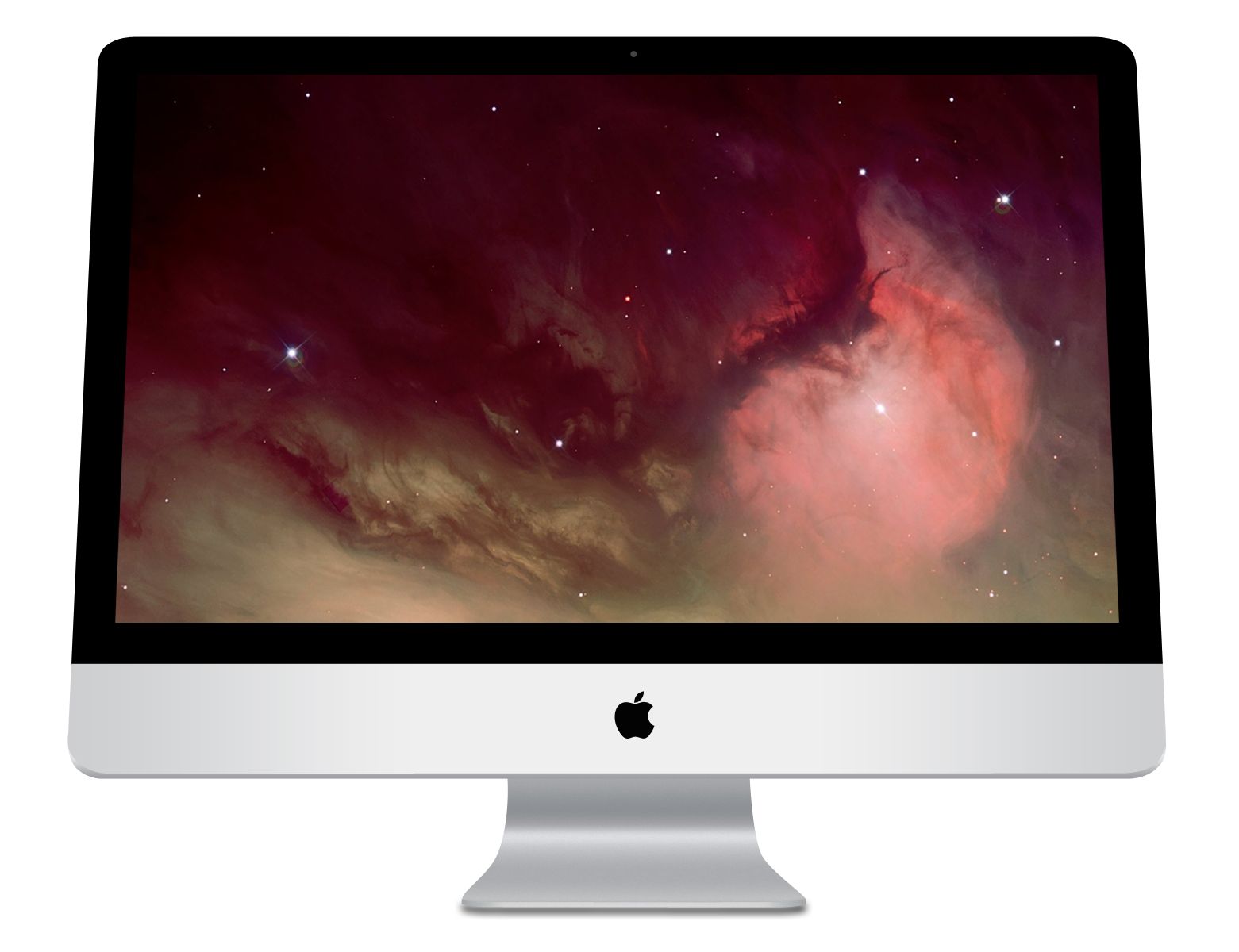
iMac

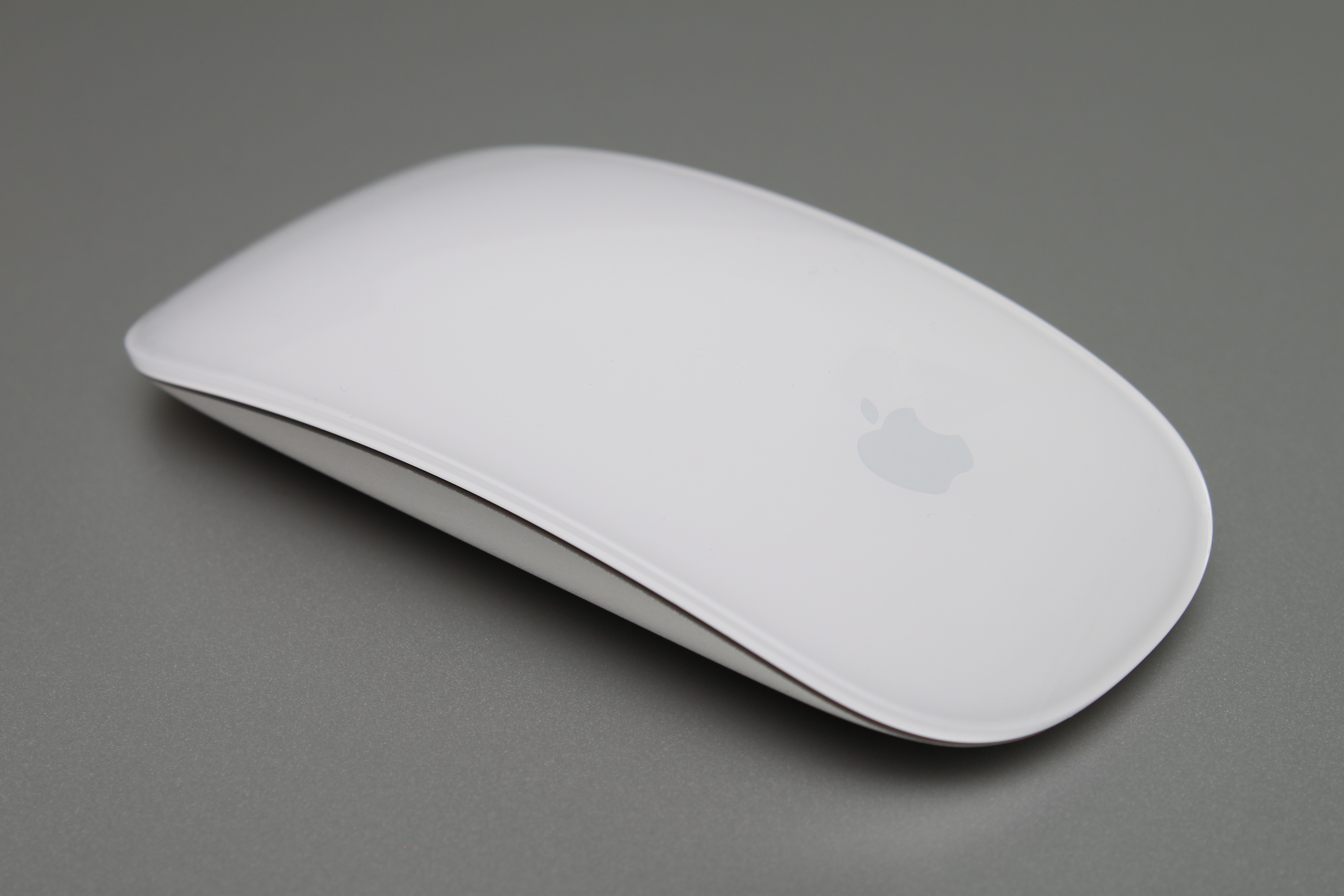
Magic Mouse

iPod Classic 6th generation

Released	Model	Family	Discontinued
January 6, 2009	MacBook Pro (Early 2009) (17")	MacBook Pro	June 8, 2009
January 29, 2009	MacBook (Early 2009) (White)	MacBook	May 27, 2009
March 3, 2009	Mac Mini (Early 2009)	Mac Mini	October 20, 2009
March 3, 2009	iMac (Early 2009)	iMac	October 20, 2009
March 3, 2009	Mac Pro (Early 2009)	Mac Pro	August 9, 2010
March 3, 2009	Time Capsule (2nd gen) (500 GB)	AirPort, drives	July 30, 2009
March 3, 2009	Time Capsule (2nd gen) (1 TB)	AirPort, drives	March 31, 2010
March 3, 2009	AirPort Extreme 802.11n (3rd gen)	AirPort	October 20, 2009
March 3, 2009	Apple Keyboard (short)	Keyboards	October 20, 2009
March 11, 2009	iPod Shuffle (3rd gen) (4 GB)	iPod Shuffle	September 1, 2010
April 7, 2009	Xserve (2009)	Xserve	January 31, 2011
April 7, 2009	iMac (Mid 2009)	iMac	March 7, 2012
May 27, 2009	MacBook (Mid 2009)	MacBook	October 20, 2009
June 8, 2009	MacBook Pro (Mid 2009)	MacBook Pro	April 13, 2010
June 8, 2009	MacBook Air (Mid 2009)	MacBook Air	October 20, 2010
June 19, 2009	iPhone 3GS (16 & 32 GB)	iPhone	June 24, 2010
July 30, 2009	Time Capsule (2nd gen) (2 TB)	AirPort, drives	March 31, 2010
September 9, 2009	iPod Nano (5th gen)	iPod Nano	September 1, 2010
September 9, 2009	iPod Classic (6th gen) (160 GB)	iPod Classic	September 9, 2014
September 9, 2009	iPod Touch (3rd gen)	iPod Touch	September 1, 2010
September 9, 2009	iPod Shuffle (3rd gen) (2 GB)	iPod Shuffle	September 1, 2010
October 20, 2009	MacBook (Late 2009)	MacBook	May 18, 2010
October 20, 2009	Mac Mini (Late 2009)	Mac Mini	June 15, 2010
October 20, 2009	iMac (Late 2009)	iMac	July 27, 2010
October 20, 2009	Magic Mouse	Pointing devices	October 13, 2015
October 20, 2009	AirPort Extreme 802.11n (4th gen)	AirPort	June 21, 2011

=== 2010s ===
==== 2010 ====
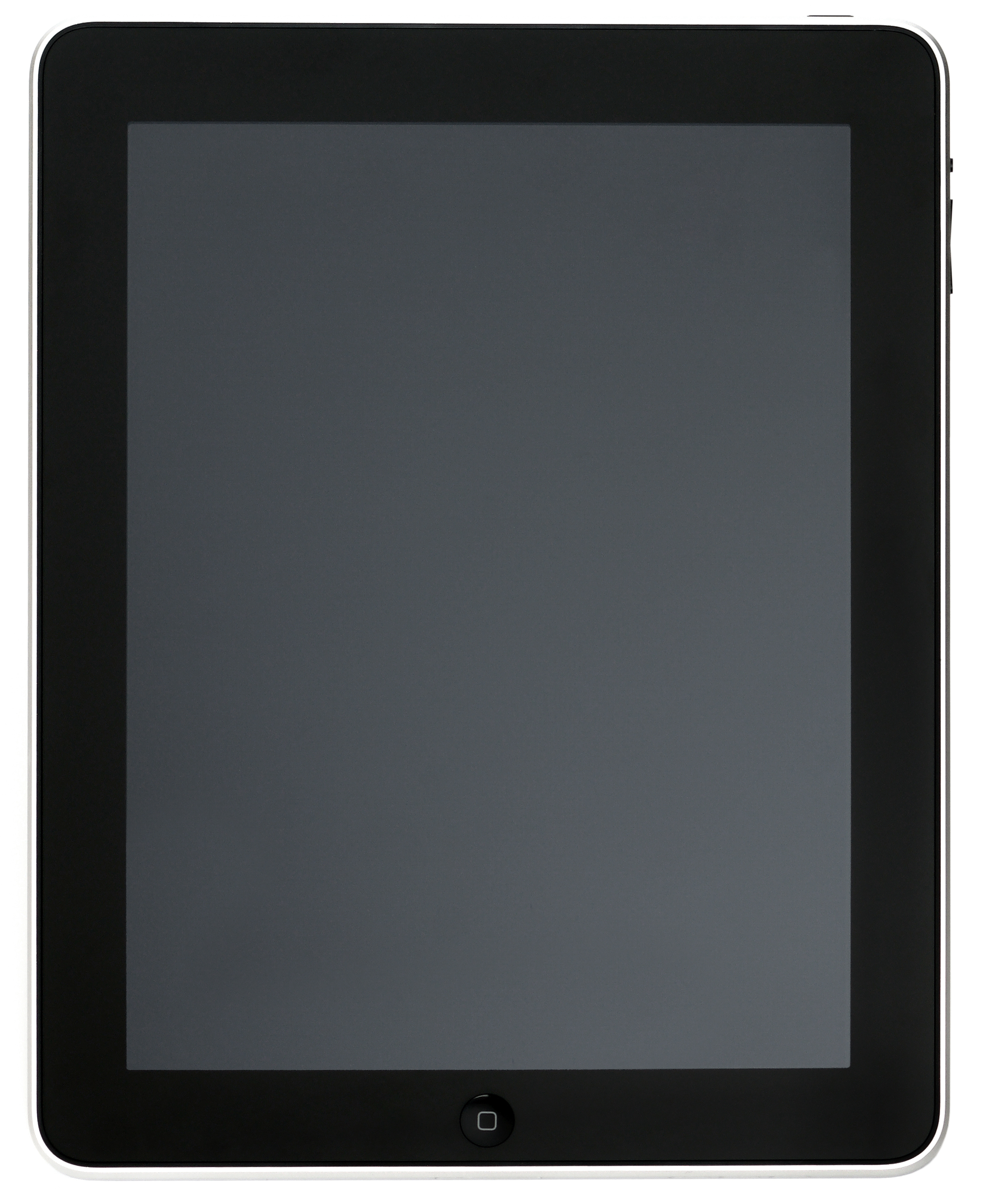
iPad

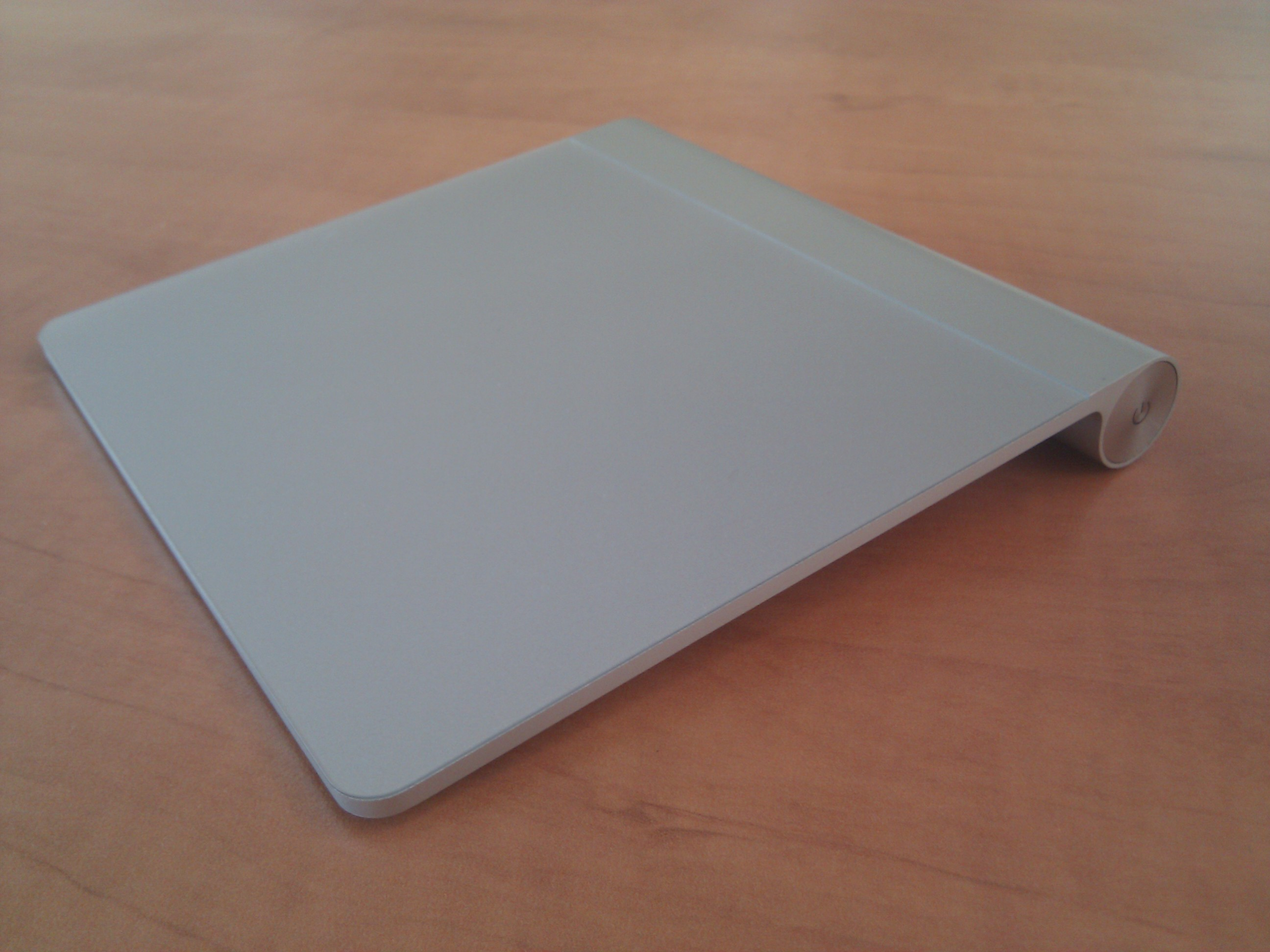
Magic Trackpad

Released	Model	Family	Discontinued
March 31, 2010	Time Capsule (3rd gen)	AirPort, drives	June 21, 2011
April 3, 2010	iPad Wi-Fi	iPad	March 3, 2011
April 13, 2010	MacBook Pro (Mid 2010)	MacBook Pro	February 24, 2011
April 30, 2010	iPad Wi-Fi + 3G	iPad	March 2, 2011
May 18, 2010	MacBook (Mid 2010)	MacBook	July 20, 2011
June 15, 2010	Mac Mini (Mid 2010)	Mac Mini	July 20, 2011
June 7, 2010	iPhone 3GS (8 GB)	iPhone	September 12, 2012
June 7, 2010	iPhone 4 (GSM) (16 & 32 GB)	iPhone	October 4, 2011
July 27, 2010	iMac (Mid 2010)	iMac	May 3, 2011
July 27, 2010	Magic Trackpad	Pointing devices	October 13, 2015
July 27, 2010	Apple Battery Charger	Input Device Accessories	January 15, 2016
July 27, 2010	LED Cinema Display (27-inch)	Displays	December 2, 2013
August 9, 2010	Mac Pro (Mid 2010)	Mac Pro	June 11, 2012
September 1, 2010	iPod Touch (4th generation) (8 & 64 GB)	iPod Touch	September 12, 2012
September 1, 2010	iPod Touch (4th generation) (32 GB)	iPod Touch	May 30, 2013
September 1, 2010	iPod Nano (6th gen)	iPod Nano	September 12, 2012
September 1, 2010	iPod Shuffle (4th gen)	iPod Shuffle	July 27, 2017
September 1, 2010	Apple TV (2nd gen)	Apple TV	March 7, 2012
October 20, 2010	MacBook Air (Late 2010)	MacBook Air	July 20, 2011

==== 2011 ====
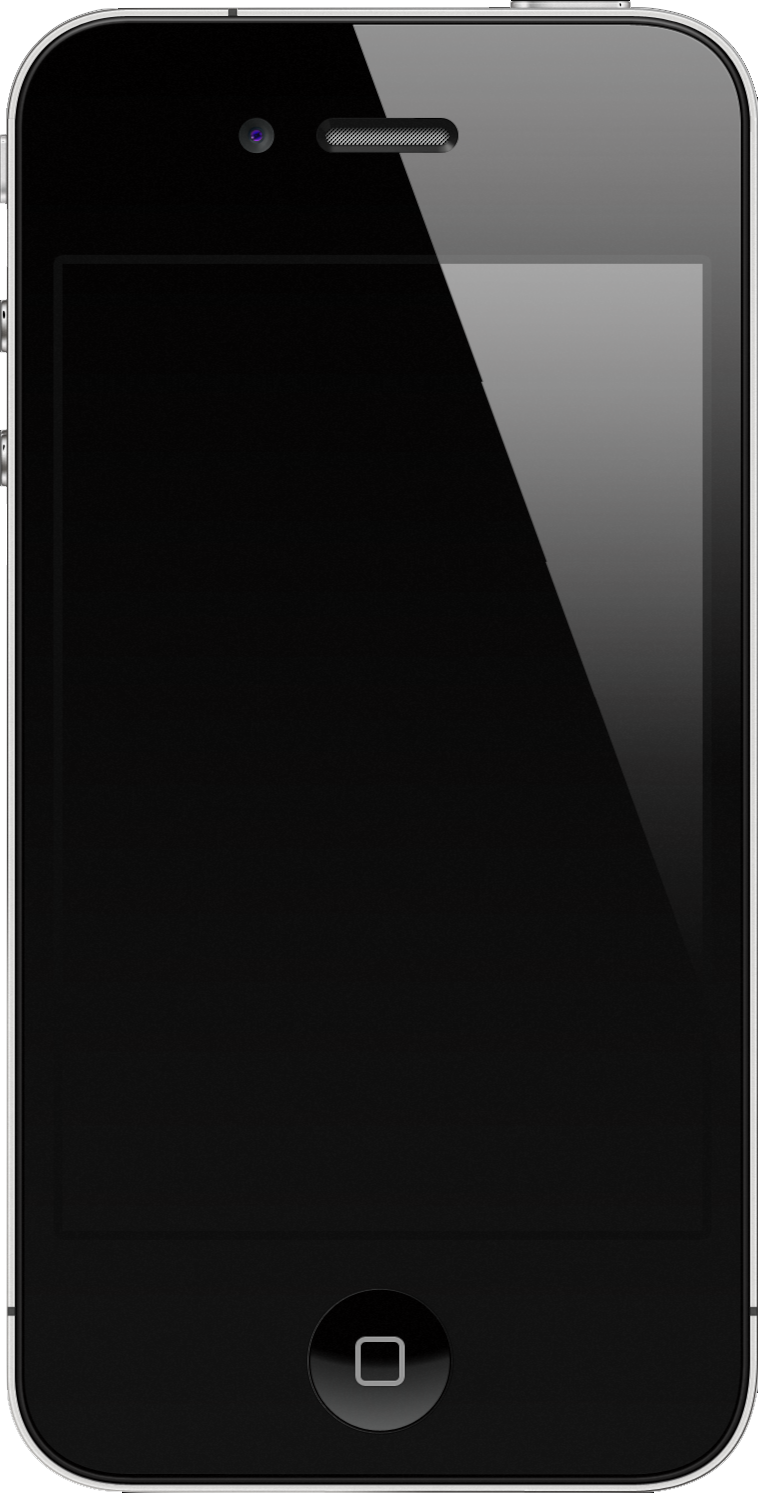
iPhone 4

Released	Model	Family	Discontinued
February 10, 2011	iPhone 4 (CDMA) (16 & 32 GB)	iPhone	October 4, 2011
February 24, 2011	MacBook Pro (Early 2011)	MacBook Pro	October 24, 2011
March 11, 2011	iPad 2 (16 GB)	iPad	March 18, 2014
March 11, 2011	iPad 2 (32 & 64 GB)	iPad	March 7, 2012
May 3, 2011	iMac (Mid 2011)	iMac	October 23, 2012
June 21, 2011	AirPort Extreme 802.11n (5th gen)	AirPort	June 10, 2013
June 21, 2011	Time Capsule (4th gen)	AirPort, drives	June 10, 2013
July 20, 2011	MacBook Air (Mid 2011)	MacBook Air	June 11, 2012
July 20, 2011	Mac Mini (Mid 2011)	Mac Mini	October 23, 2012
July 20, 2011	Thunderbolt Display	Displays	June 23, 2016
October 14, 2011	iPhone 4 (8 GB)	iPhone	September 10, 2013
October 14, 2011	iPhone 4S (16 GB)	iPhone	September 10, 2013
October 14, 2011	iPhone 4S (32 & 64 GB)	iPhone	September 12, 2012
October 24, 2011	MacBook Pro (Late 2011)	MacBook Pro	June 11, 2012

==== 2012 ====
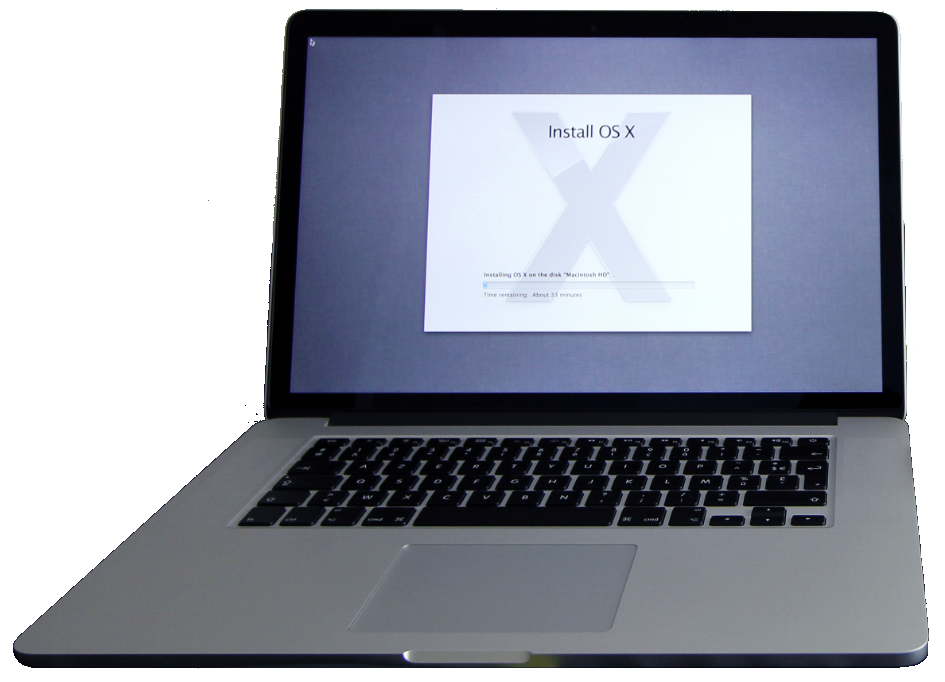
MacBook Pro (Retina)

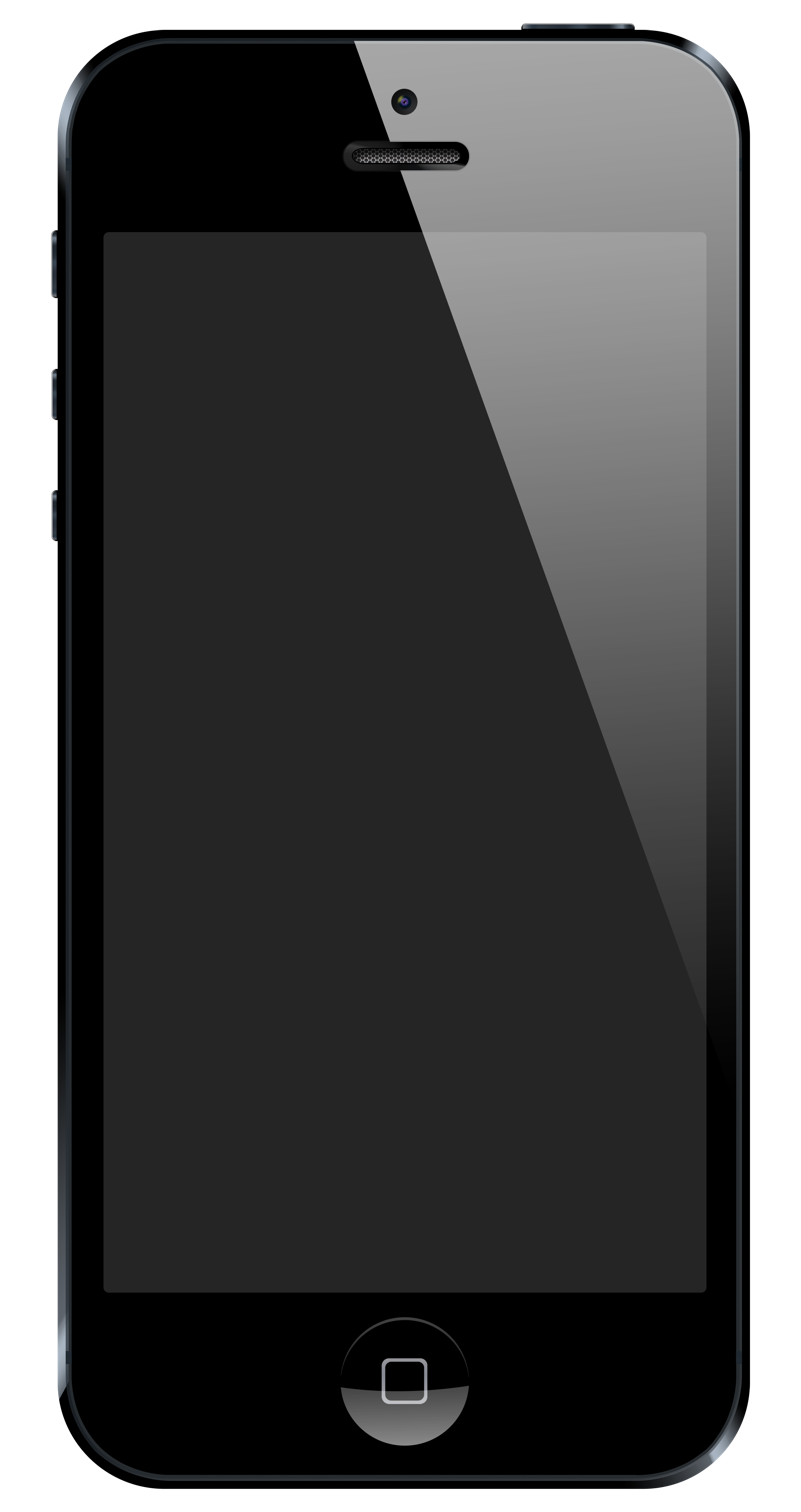
iPhone 5

Released	Model	Family	Discontinued
March 16, 2012	iPad (3rd gen)	iPad	October 23, 2012
March 16, 2012	Apple TV (3rd gen)	Apple TV	January 28, 2013
June 11, 2012	Mac Pro (Mid 2012)	Mac Pro	December 19, 2013
June 11, 2012	MacBook Air (Mid 2012)	MacBook Air	June 10, 2013
June 11, 2012	MacBook Pro (13-inch, Mid 2012)	MacBook Pro	October 27, 2016
June 11, 2012	MacBook Pro (15-inch, Mid 2012)	MacBook Pro	October 22, 2013
June 11, 2012	MacBook Pro (Retina, Mid 2012)	MacBook Pro	February 13, 2013
June 11, 2012	AirPort Express 802.11n (2nd gen)	AirPort Express	April 26, 2018
September 12, 2012	EarPods with 3.5mm connector	Headphones	current
September 12, 2012	iPod Touch (4th generation) (16 GB)	iPod Touch	May 30, 2013
September 21, 2012	iPhone 5	iPhone	September 10, 2013
October 11, 2012	iPod Touch (5th generation) (32 & 64 GB)	iPod Touch	July 15, 2015
October 11, 2012	iPod Nano (7th gen)	iPod Nano	July 27, 2017
October 23, 2012	Mac Mini (Late 2012)	Mac Mini	October 16, 2014
October 23, 2012	MacBook Pro (Retina, 13-inch, Late 2012)	MacBook Pro	February 13, 2013
November 2, 2012	iPad Mini Wi-Fi (16 GB)	iPad mini	June 19, 2015
November 2, 2012	iPad Mini Wi-Fi (32 & 64 GB)	iPad mini	October 22, 2013
November 2, 2012	iPad (4th gen) Wi-Fi (16 GB)	iPad	October 16, 2014
November 2, 2012	iPad (4th gen) Wi-Fi (32 & 64 GB)	iPad	October 22, 2013
November 16, 2012	iPad Mini Wi-Fi + Cellular (16 GB)	iPad mini	June 19, 2015
November 16, 2012	iPad Mini Wi-Fi + Cellular (32 & 64 GB)	iPad mini	October 22, 2013
November 16, 2012	iPad (4th gen) Wi-Fi + Cellular (16 GB)	iPad	October 16, 2014
November 16, 2012	iPad (4th gen) Wi-Fi + Cellular (32 & 64 GB)	iPad	October 22, 2013
November 30, 2012	iMac (21.5-inch, Late 2012)	iMac	September 24, 2013
December 2012	iMac (27-inch, Late 2012)	iMac	September 24, 2013

==== 2013 ====
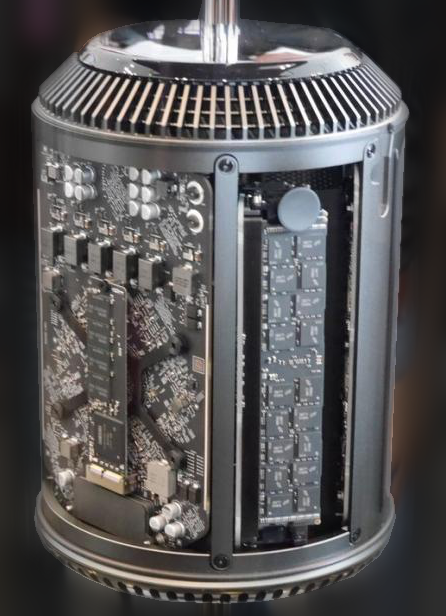
Mac Pro (cylinder), released December 19, 2013

Released	Model	Family	Discontinued
January 28, 2013	Apple TV (3rd generation Rev A)	Apple TV	September 8, 2016
February 5, 2013	iPad (4th gen) (128 GB)	iPad	October 22, 2013
February 13, 2013	MacBook Pro (Retina, Early 2013)	MacBook Pro	October 22, 2013
May 30, 2013	iPod Touch 16 GB (5th generation, Mid 2013)	iPod Touch	June 26, 2014
June 10, 2013	AirPort Extreme 802.11ac	AirPort	April 26, 2018
June 10, 2013	AirPort Time Capsule 802.11ac	AirPort, drives	April 26, 2018
June 10, 2013	MacBook Air (Mid 2013)	MacBook Air	April 29, 2014
September 20, 2013	iPhone 4S (8 GB)	iPhone	September 9, 2014
September 20, 2013	iPhone 5C (16 & 32 GB)	iPhone	September 9, 2014
September 20, 2013	iPhone 5S (16 & 32 GB)	iPhone	March 21, 2016
September 20, 2013	iPhone 5S (64 GB)	iPhone	September 9, 2014
September 24, 2013	iMac (21.5-inch, Late 2013)	iMac	June 18, 2014
September 24, 2013	iMac (27-inch, Late 2013)	iMac	October 13, 2015
October 22, 2013	MacBook Pro (Retina, Late 2013)	MacBook Pro	July 29, 2014
November 1, 2013	iPad Air (16 & 32 GB)	iPad Air	March 21, 2016
November 1, 2013	iPad Air (64 & 128 GB)	iPad Air	October 16, 2014
November 12, 2013	iPad Mini 2 (16 GB)	iPad mini	September 7, 2016
November 12, 2013	iPad Mini 2 (32 GB)	iPad mini	March 21, 2017
November 12, 2013	iPad Mini 2 (64 & 128 GB)	iPad mini	October 16, 2014
December 19, 2013	Mac Pro (Late 2013)	Mac Pro	December 10, 2019

==== 2014 ====
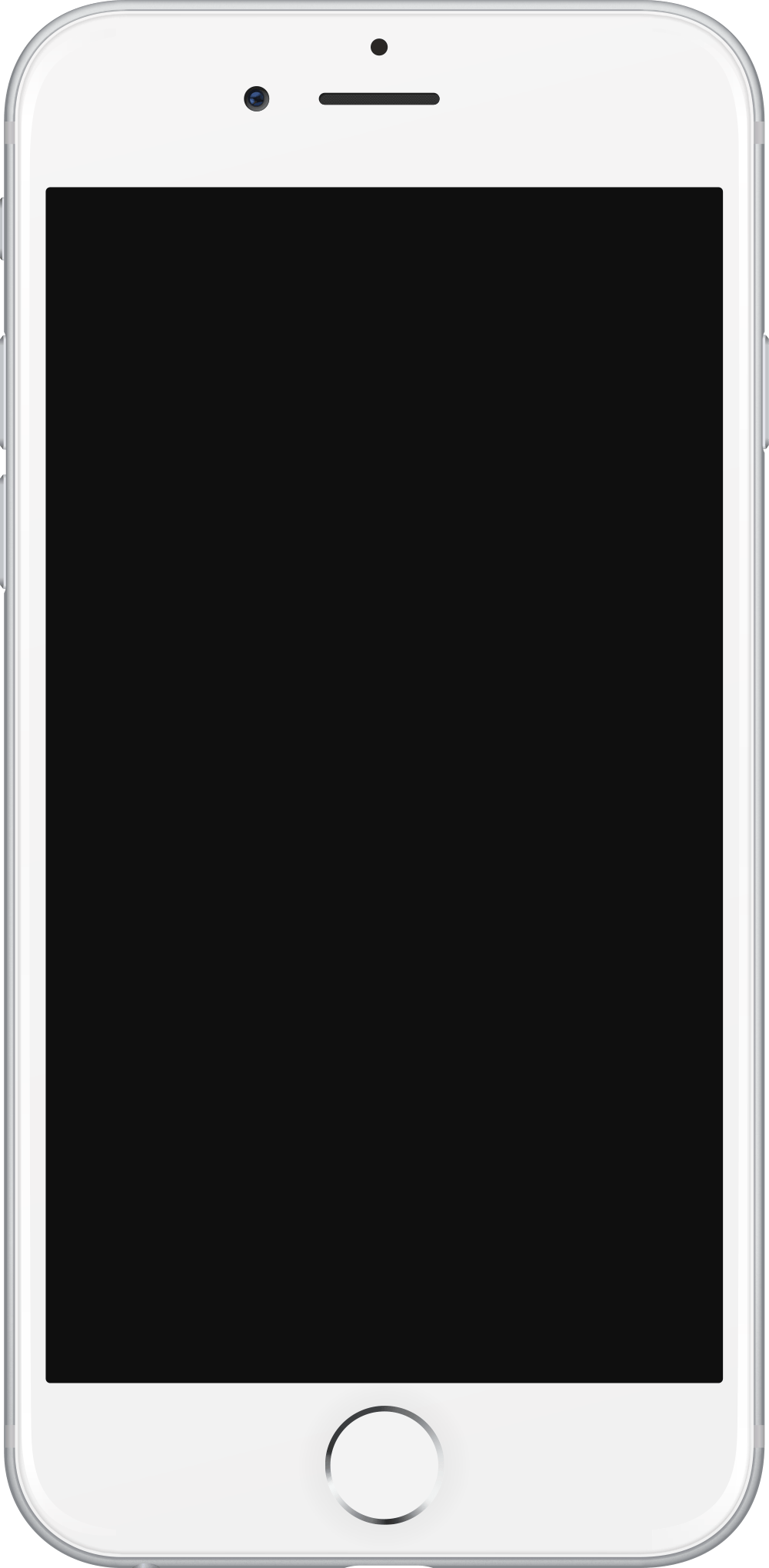
iPhone 6

Released	Model	Family	Discontinued
March 18, 2014	iPhone 5C (8 GB)	iPhone	September 9, 2015
April 29, 2014	MacBook Air (Early 2014)	MacBook Air	March 9, 2015
June 18, 2014	iMac (21.5-inch, Mid 2014)	iMac	June 5, 2017
June 26, 2014	iPod Touch (5th generation) (16 GB)	iPod Touch	July 15, 2015
July 29, 2014	MacBook Pro (Retina, Mid 2014)	MacBook Pro	March 9, 2015
September 19, 2014	iPhone 6 (16 & 64 GB)	iPhone	September 7, 2016
September 19, 2014	iPhone 6 Plus (16 & 64 GB)	iPhone	September 7, 2016
September 19, 2014	iPhone 6 (128 GB)	iPhone	September 9, 2015
September 19, 2014	iPhone 6 Plus (128 GB)	iPhone	September 9, 2015
October 16, 2014	iMac (Retina 5K, 27-inch, Late 2014)	iMac	October 13, 2015
October 16, 2014	Mac Mini (Late 2014)	Mac Mini	October 30, 2018
October 22, 2014	iPad Air 2 (16 & 64 GB)	iPad Air	September 7, 2016
October 22, 2014	iPad Air 2 (128 GB)	iPad Air	March 21, 2017
October 22, 2014	iPad Mini 3	iPad mini	September 9, 2015

==== 2015 ====
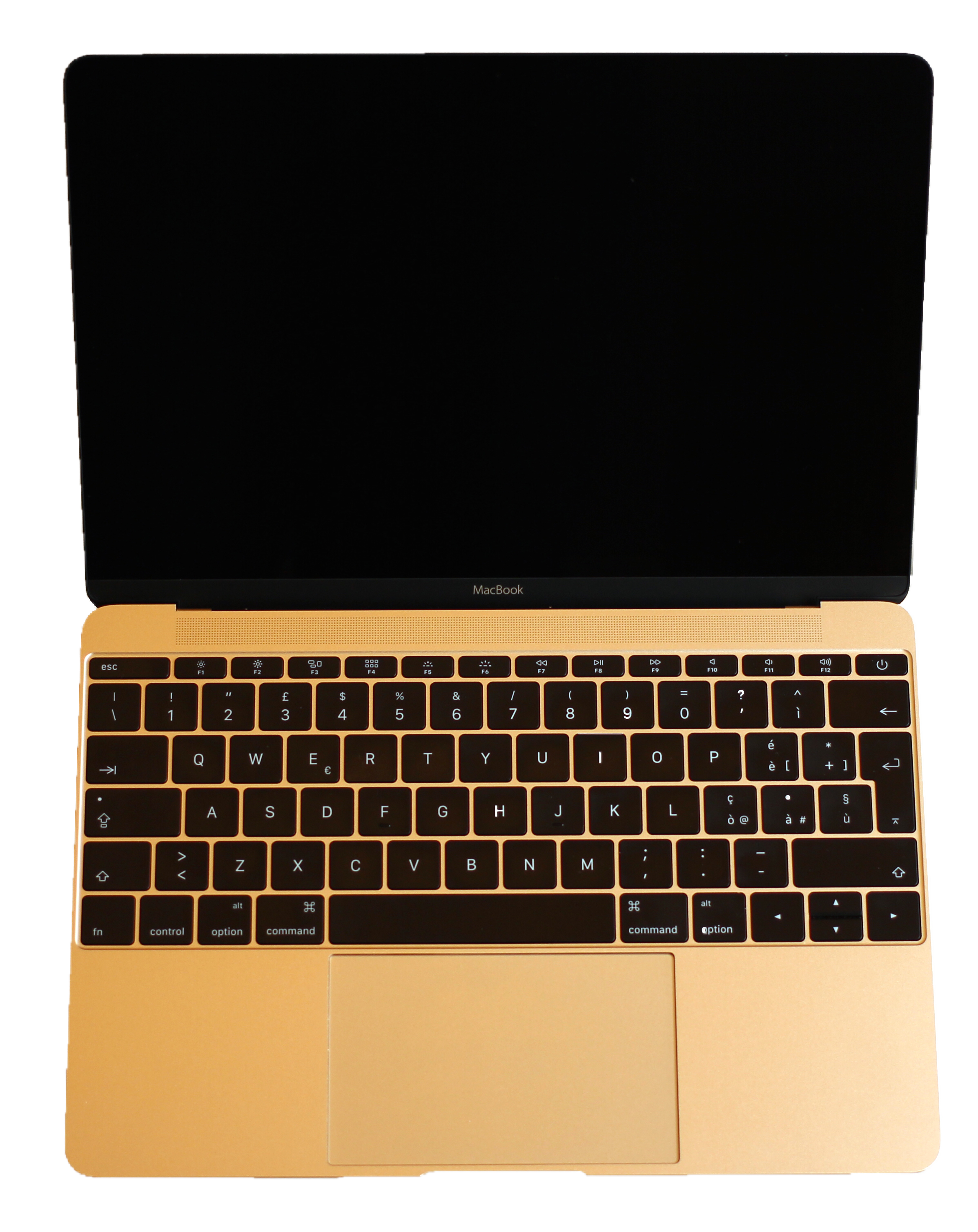
Retina MacBook

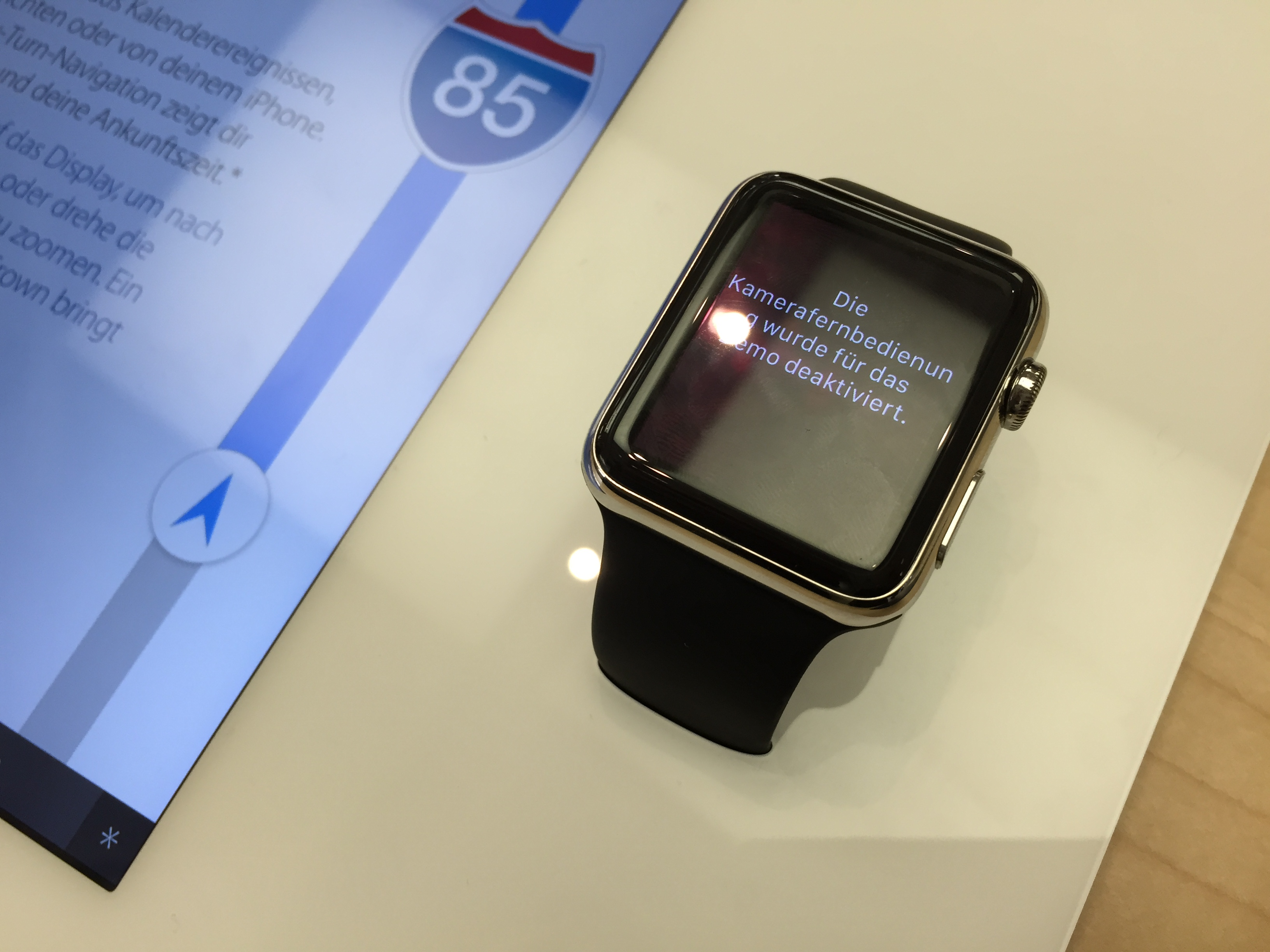
Apple Watch

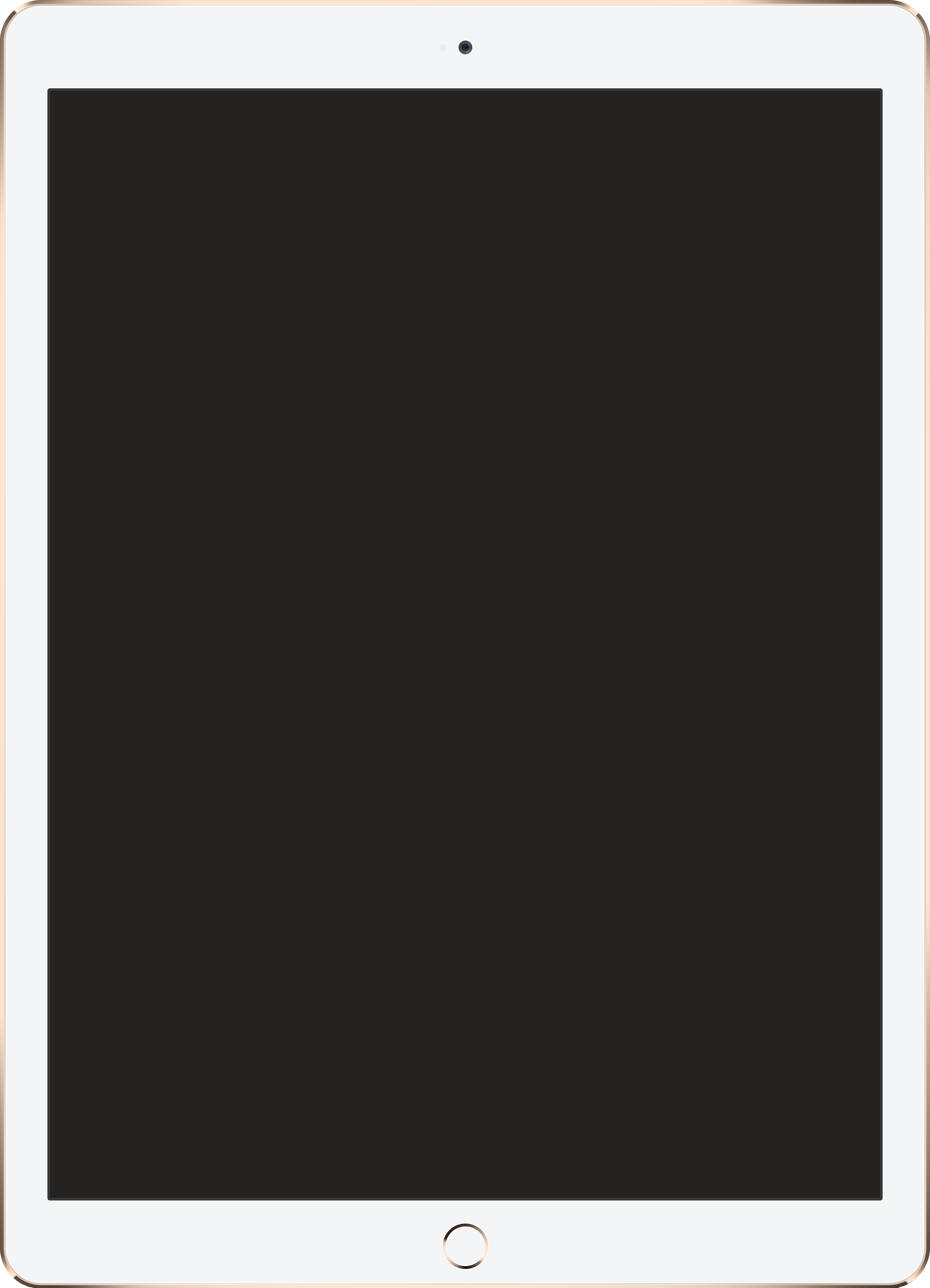
12.9-inch iPad Pro

Released	Model	Family	Discontinued
March 9, 2015	MacBook Air (13-inch, Early 2015)	MacBook Air	June 5, 2017
March 9, 2015	MacBook Air (11-inch, Early 2015)	MacBook Air	October 27, 2016
March 9, 2015	MacBook Pro (Retina, 13-inch, Early 2015)	MacBook Pro	June 5, 2017
April 10, 2015	MacBook (Retina, 12-inch, Early 2015)	MacBook	April 19, 2016
April 24, 2015	Apple Watch (1st generation)	Apple Watch	September 7, 2016
April 24, 2015	Apple Watch Sport (1st generation)	Apple Watch	September 7, 2016
April 24, 2015	Apple Watch Edition (1st generation)	Apple Watch	September 7, 2016
May 19, 2015	MacBook Pro (Retina, 15-inch, Mid 2015)	MacBook Pro	July 12, 2018
May 19, 2015	iMac (Retina 5K, 27-inch, Mid 2015)	iMac	October 13, 2015
July 15, 2015	iPod Touch (6th generation) (32 GB and 128 GB)	iPod Touch	May 28, 2019
July 15, 2015	iPod Touch (6th generation) (16 GB and 64 GB)	iPod Touch	July 27, 2017
September 9, 2015	iPad Mini 4 (16 GB and 64 GB)	iPad mini	September 7, 2016
September 9, 2015	iPad Mini 4 (32 GB)	iPad mini	March 21, 2017
September 9, 2015	iPad Mini 4 (128 GB)	iPad mini	March 18, 2019
September 25, 2015	iPhone 6S (16 GB and 64 GB)	iPhone	September 7, 2016
September 25, 2015	iPhone 6S (128 GB)	iPhone	September 12, 2018
September 25, 2015	iPhone 6S Plus (16 GB and 64 GB)	iPhone	September 7, 2016
September 25, 2015	iPhone 6S Plus (128 GB)	iPhone	September 12, 2018
October 13, 2015	iMac (21.5-inch, Late 2015)	iMac	June 5, 2017
October 13, 2015	iMac (Retina 4K, 21.5-inch, Late 2015)	iMac	June 5, 2017
October 13, 2015	iMac (Retina 5K, 27-inch, Late 2015)	iMac	June 5, 2017
October 13, 2015	Magic Mouse 2 (Lightning)	Pointing devices	October 28, 2024
October 13, 2015	Magic Trackpad 2 (Lightning)	Pointing devices	October 28, 2024
October 13, 2015	Magic Keyboard (first generation)	Keyboards	May 21, 2021
October 30, 2015	Apple TV HD (previously Apple TV (4th generation)) (32 GB)	Apple TV	October 18, 2022
October 30, 2015	Apple TV HD (previously Apple TV (4th generation)) (64 GB)	Apple TV	September 12, 2017
October 30, 2015	Siri Remote (1st generation)	Apple TV	April 20, 2021
November 11, 2015	iPad Pro 12.9-inch (32 and 128 GB)	iPad Pro	June 5, 2017
November 11, 2015	Apple Pencil (1st generation)	Pencil	current
November 11, 2015	Smart Keyboard	Keyboards	May 7, 2024

==== 2016 ====
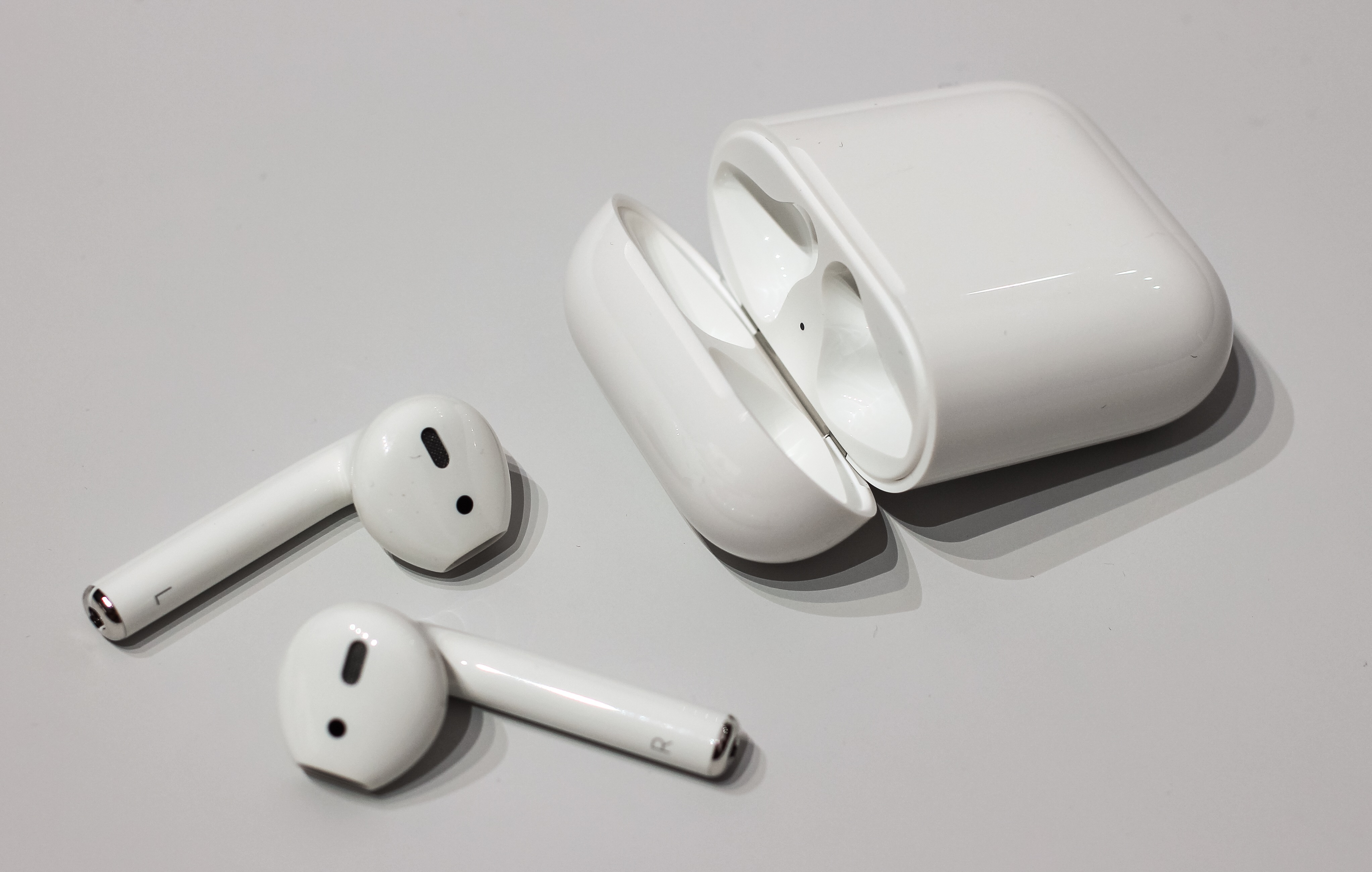
AirPods

Released	Model	Family	Discontinued
March 31, 2016	iPad Pro (9.7-inch)	iPad Pro	June 5, 2017
March 31, 2016	iPad Pro 12.9-inch (256 GB)	iPad Pro	June 5, 2017
March 31, 2016	iPhone SE (1st generation) (16 & 64 GB)	iPhone	March 21, 2017
April 19, 2016	MacBook (Retina, 12-inch, Early 2016)	MacBook	June 5, 2017
September 7, 2016	iPad Air 2 (32 GB)	iPad Air	March 21, 2017
September 16, 2016	iPhone 7 (32 & 128 GB)	iPhone	September 10, 2019
September 16, 2016	iPhone 7 (256 GB)	iPhone	September 12, 2017
September 16, 2016	iPhone 7 Plus (32 & 128 GB)	iPhone	September 10, 2019
September 16, 2016	iPhone 7 Plus (256 GB)	iPhone	September 12, 2017
September 16, 2016	EarPods with Lightning Connector	Headphones	current
September 16, 2016	iPhone 6S (32 GB)	iPhone	September 12, 2018
September 16, 2016	iPhone 6S Plus (32 GB)	iPhone	September 12, 2018
September 16, 2016	Apple Watch Series 1	Apple Watch	September 12, 2018
September 16, 2016	Apple Watch Series 2	Apple Watch	September 12, 2017
September 16, 2016	Apple Watch Hermès Series 2	Apple Watch	September 12, 2017
September 16, 2016	Apple Watch Edition Series 2	Apple Watch	September 12, 2017
October 27, 2016	MacBook Pro (13-inch, 2016, Two Thunderbolt 3 ports)	MacBook Pro	June 5, 2017
October 27, 2016	MacBook Pro (13-inch, 2016, Four Thunderbolt 3 ports)	MacBook Pro	June 5, 2017
October 27, 2016	MacBook Pro (15-inch, 2016)	MacBook Pro	June 5, 2017
October 28, 2016	Apple Watch Nike+ Series 2	Apple Watch	September 12, 2017
December 19, 2016	AirPods (1st generation)	Headphones	March 20, 2019

==== 2017 ====
iPhone X

iMac Pro

Released	Model	Family	Discontinued
March 10, 2017	iPhone 6 (32 GB)	iPhone	September 12, 2018
March 24, 2017	iPhone SE (1st generation) (32 GB and 128 GB)	iPhone	September 12, 2018
March 24, 2017	iPad (5th generation)	iPad	March 27, 2018
June 5, 2017	iPad Pro (12.9-inch) (2nd generation)	iPad Pro	November 7, 2018
June 5, 2017	iPad Pro (10.5-inch)	iPad Pro	March 18, 2019
June 5, 2017	MacBook Air (13-inch, 2017)	MacBook Air	July 9, 2019
June 5, 2017	MacBook (Retina, 12-inch, 2017)	MacBook	July 9, 2019
June 5, 2017	MacBook Pro (13-inch, 2017, Two Thunderbolt 3 ports)	MacBook Pro	July 9, 2019
June 5, 2017	MacBook Pro (13-inch, 2017, Four Thunderbolt 3 ports)	MacBook Pro	July 12, 2018
June 5, 2017	MacBook Pro (15-inch, 2017)	MacBook Pro	July 12, 2018
June 5, 2017	iMac (21.5-inch, 2017)	iMac	October 30, 2021
June 5, 2017	iMac (Retina 4K, 21.5-inch, 2017)	iMac	March 19, 2019
June 5, 2017	iMac (Retina 5K, 27-inch, 2017)	iMac	March 19, 2019
June 5, 2017	Magic Keyboard with Numeric Keypad	Keyboards	current
September 22, 2017	Apple TV 4K (1st generation)	Apple TV	April 20, 2021
September 22, 2017	Apple Watch Series 3	Apple Watch	September 7, 2022
September 22, 2017	Apple Watch Hermès Series 3	Apple Watch	September 12, 2018
September 22, 2017	Apple Watch Edition Series 3	Apple Watch	September 12, 2018
September 22, 2017	Apple Watch Nike+ Series 3	Apple Watch	September 15, 2020
September 22, 2017	iPhone 8 (64 GB)	iPhone	April 15, 2020
September 22, 2017	iPhone 8 (256 GB)	iPhone	September 10, 2019
September 22, 2017	iPhone 8 Plus (64 GB)	iPhone	April 15, 2020
September 22, 2017	iPhone 8 Plus (256 GB)	iPhone	September 10, 2019
November 3, 2017	iPhone X	iPhone	September 12, 2018
December 14, 2017	iMac Pro (2017)	iMac	March 5, 2021

==== 2018 ====
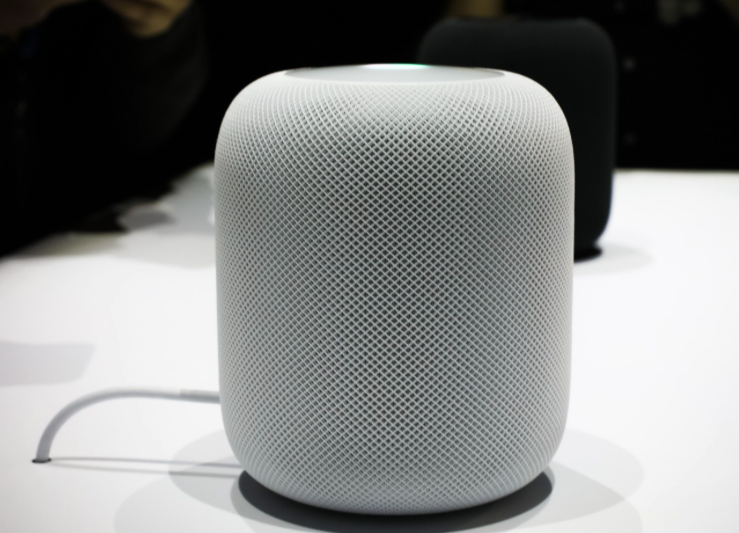
HomePod, released February 9, 2018

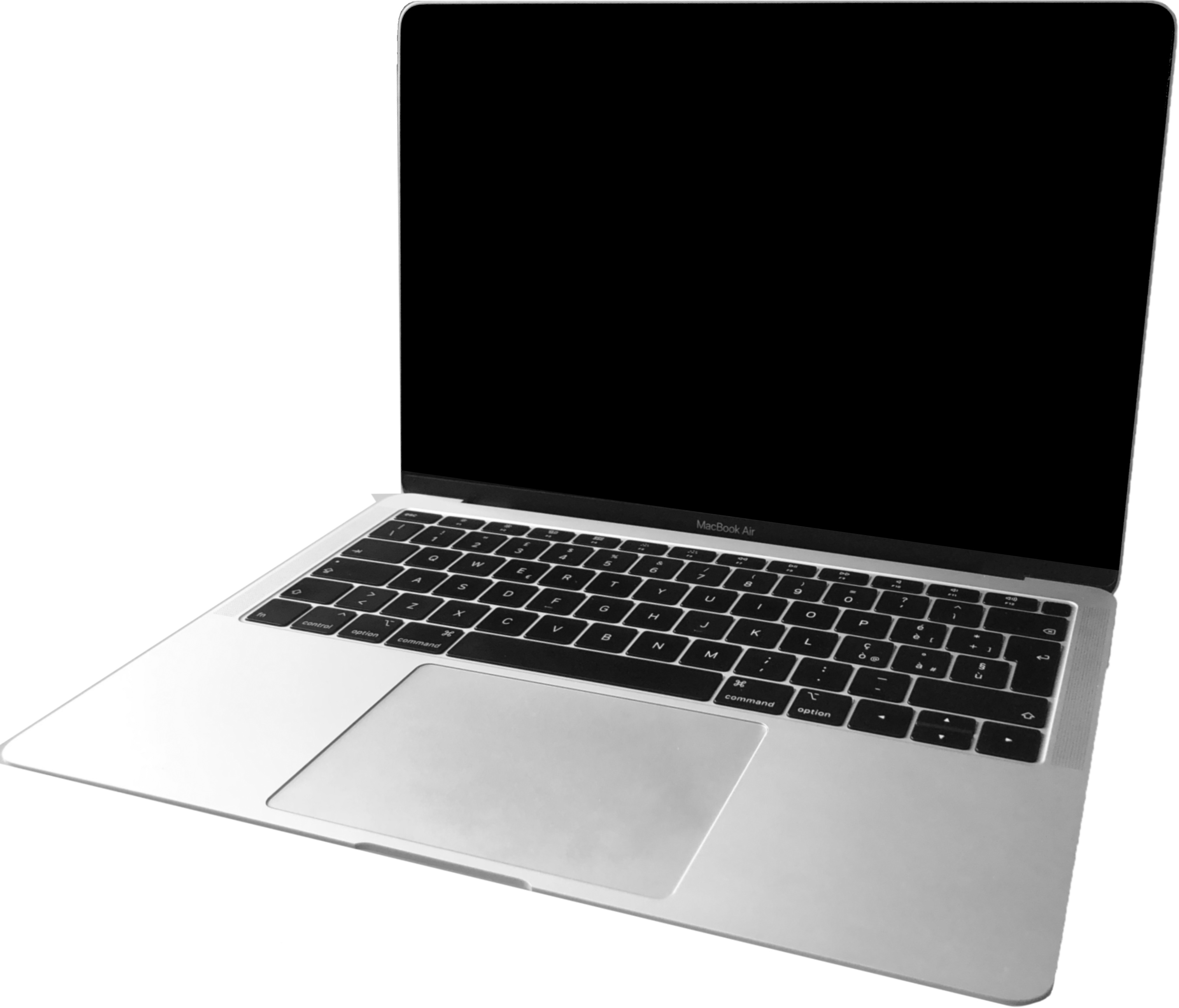
MacBook Air (Retina)

Released	Model	Family	Discontinued
February 9, 2018	HomePod (first generation)	Speakers	March 12, 2021
March 27, 2018	iPad (6th generation)	iPad	September 10, 2019
July 12, 2018	MacBook Pro (13-inch, 2018, Four Thunderbolt 3 ports)	MacBook Pro	May 21, 2019
July 12, 2018	MacBook Pro (15-inch, 2018)	MacBook Pro	May 21, 2019
September 21, 2018	Apple Watch Series 4	Apple Watch	September 10, 2019
September 21, 2018	Apple Watch Hermès Series 4	Apple Watch	September 10, 2019
September 21, 2018	Apple Watch Nike+ Series 4	Apple Watch	September 10, 2019
September 21, 2018	iPhone XS	iPhone	September 10, 2019
September 21, 2018	iPhone XS Max	iPhone	September 10, 2019
October 26, 2018	iPhone XR (64 GB and 128 GB)	iPhone	September 14, 2021
October 26, 2018	iPhone XR (256 GB)	iPhone	September 10, 2019
November 7, 2018	Smart Keyboard Folio	Keyboards	May 7, 2024
November 7, 2018	Apple Pencil (2nd generation)	Pencil	current
November 7, 2018	iPad Pro 11-inch (1st generation)	iPad Pro	March 18, 2020
November 7, 2018	iPad Pro 12.9-inch (3rd generation)	iPad Pro	March 18, 2020
November 7, 2018	MacBook Air (Retina, 13-inch, 2018)	MacBook Air	July 9, 2019
November 7, 2018	Mac Mini (2018)	Mac Mini	January 17, 2023

==== 2019 ====
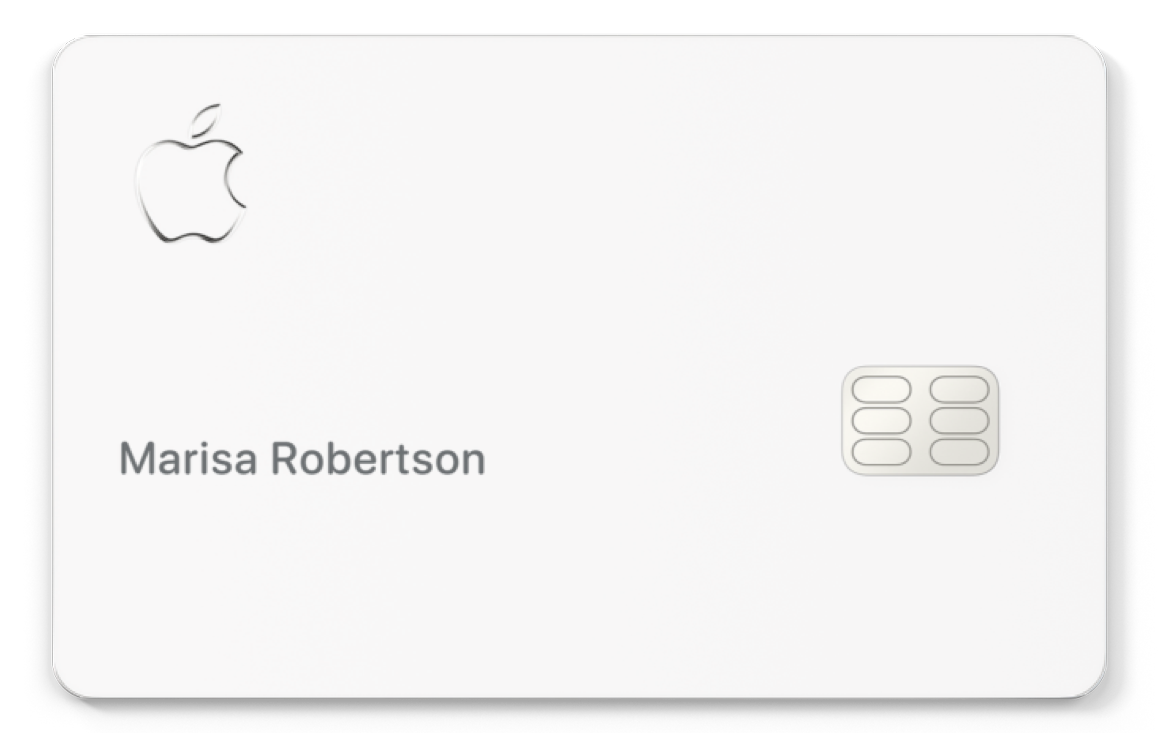
Apple Card, released August 20, 2019

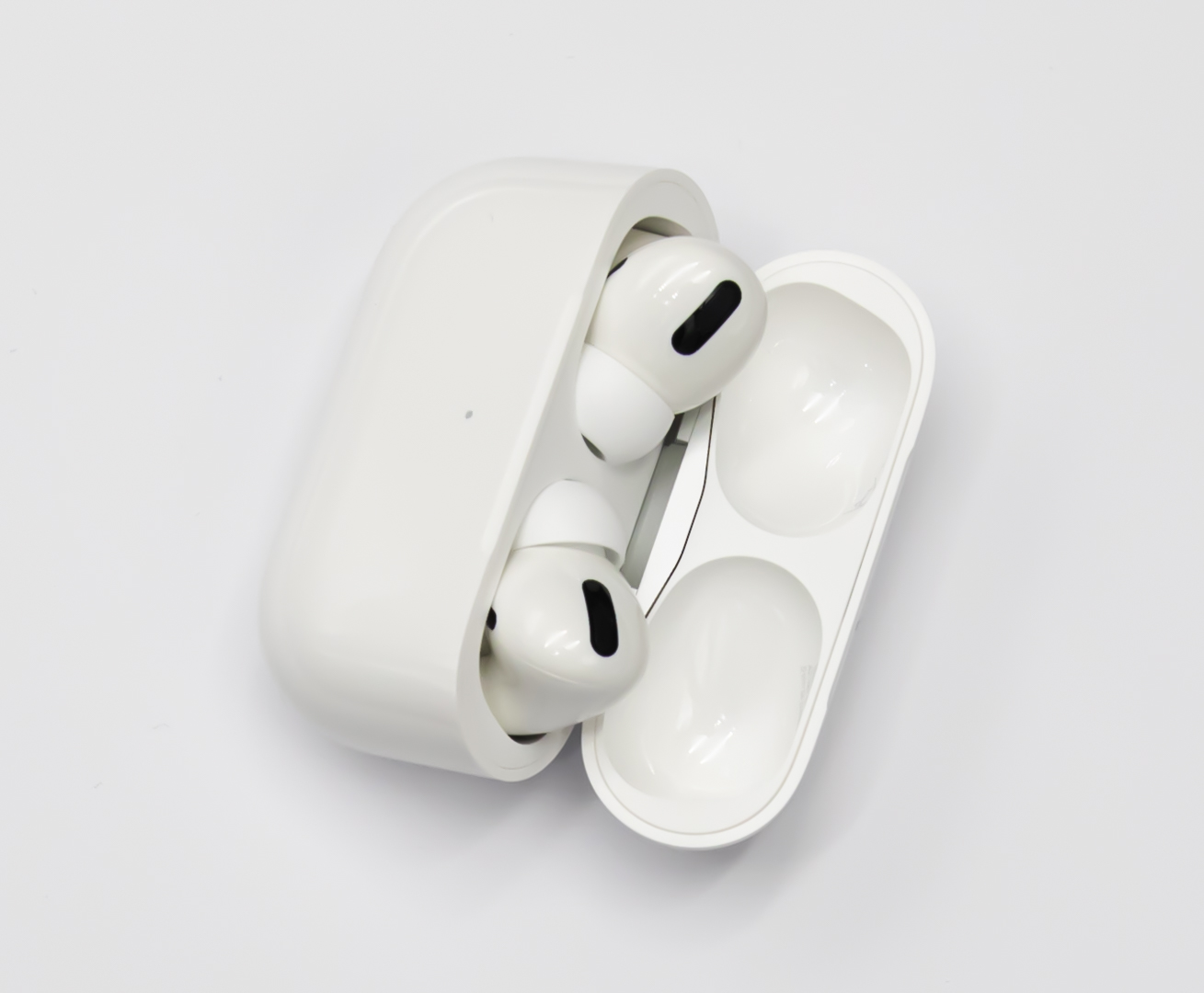
AirPods Pro, released October 30, 2019

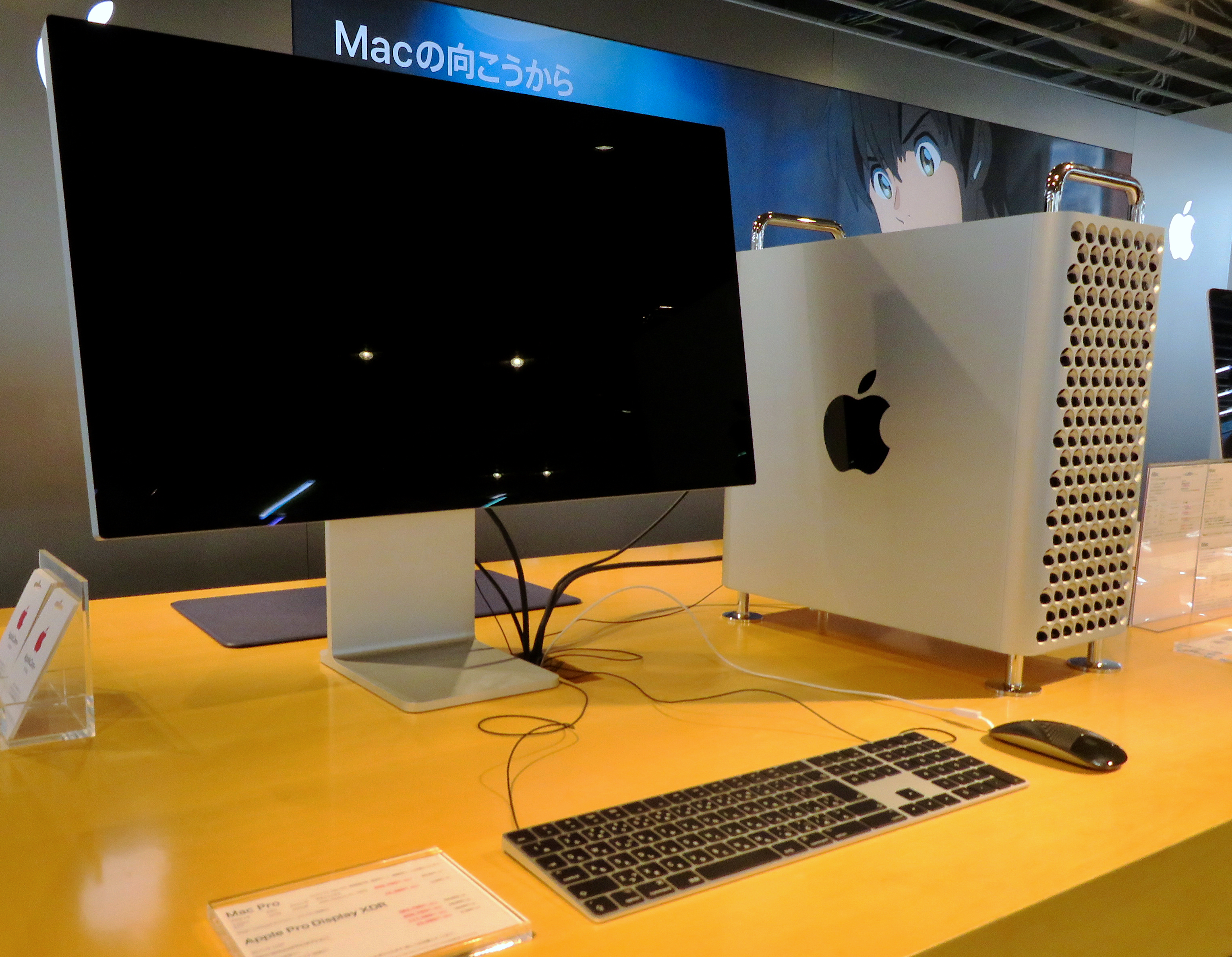
From left to right: Pro Display XDR and Mac Pro (2019), both released December 10, 2019

Released	Model	Family	Discontinued
March 18, 2019	iPad Air (3rd generation)	iPad Air	September 15, 2020
March 18, 2019	iPad Mini (5th generation)	iPad mini	September 14, 2021
March 19, 2019	iMac (Retina 4K, 21.5-inch, 2019)	iMac	April 20, 2021
March 19, 2019	iMac (Retina 5K, 27-inch, 2019)	iMac	August 4, 2020
March 20, 2019	AirPods (2nd generation)	Headphones	September 9, 2024
May 21, 2019	MacBook Pro (13-inch, 2019, Four Thunderbolt 3 ports)	MacBook Pro	May 4, 2020
May 21, 2019	MacBook Pro (15-inch, 2019)	MacBook Pro	November 13, 2019
May 28, 2019	iPod Touch (7th generation)	iPod Touch	May 10, 2022
July 9, 2019	MacBook Air (Retina, 13-inch, 2019)	MacBook Air	March 18, 2020
July 9, 2019	MacBook Pro (13-inch, 2019, Two Thunderbolt 3 ports)	MacBook Pro	May 4, 2020
August 20, 2019	Apple Card	iPhone accessories	current
September 20, 2019	Apple Watch Series 5	Apple Watch	September 15, 2020
September 20, 2019	Apple Watch Hermès Series 5	Apple Watch	September 15, 2020
September 20, 2019	Apple Watch Nike Series 5	Apple Watch	September 15, 2020
September 20, 2019	Apple Watch Edition Series 5	Apple Watch	September 15, 2020
September 20, 2019	iPhone 8 (128 GB)	iPhone	April 15, 2020
September 20, 2019	iPhone 8 Plus (128 GB)	iPhone	April 15, 2020
September 20, 2019	iPhone 11	iPhone	September 7, 2022
September 20, 2019	iPhone 11 Pro	iPhone	October 13, 2020
September 20, 2019	iPhone 11 Pro Max	iPhone	October 13, 2020
September 25, 2019	iPad (7th generation)	iPad	September 15, 2020
October 30, 2019	AirPods Pro (1st generation)	Headphones	September 7, 2022
November 13, 2019	MacBook Pro (16-inch, 2019)	MacBook Pro	October 18, 2021
December 10, 2019	Mac Pro (2019)	Mac Pro	June 5, 2023
December 10, 2019	Pro Display XDR	Displays	March 3, 2026

=== 2020s ===
==== 2020 ====
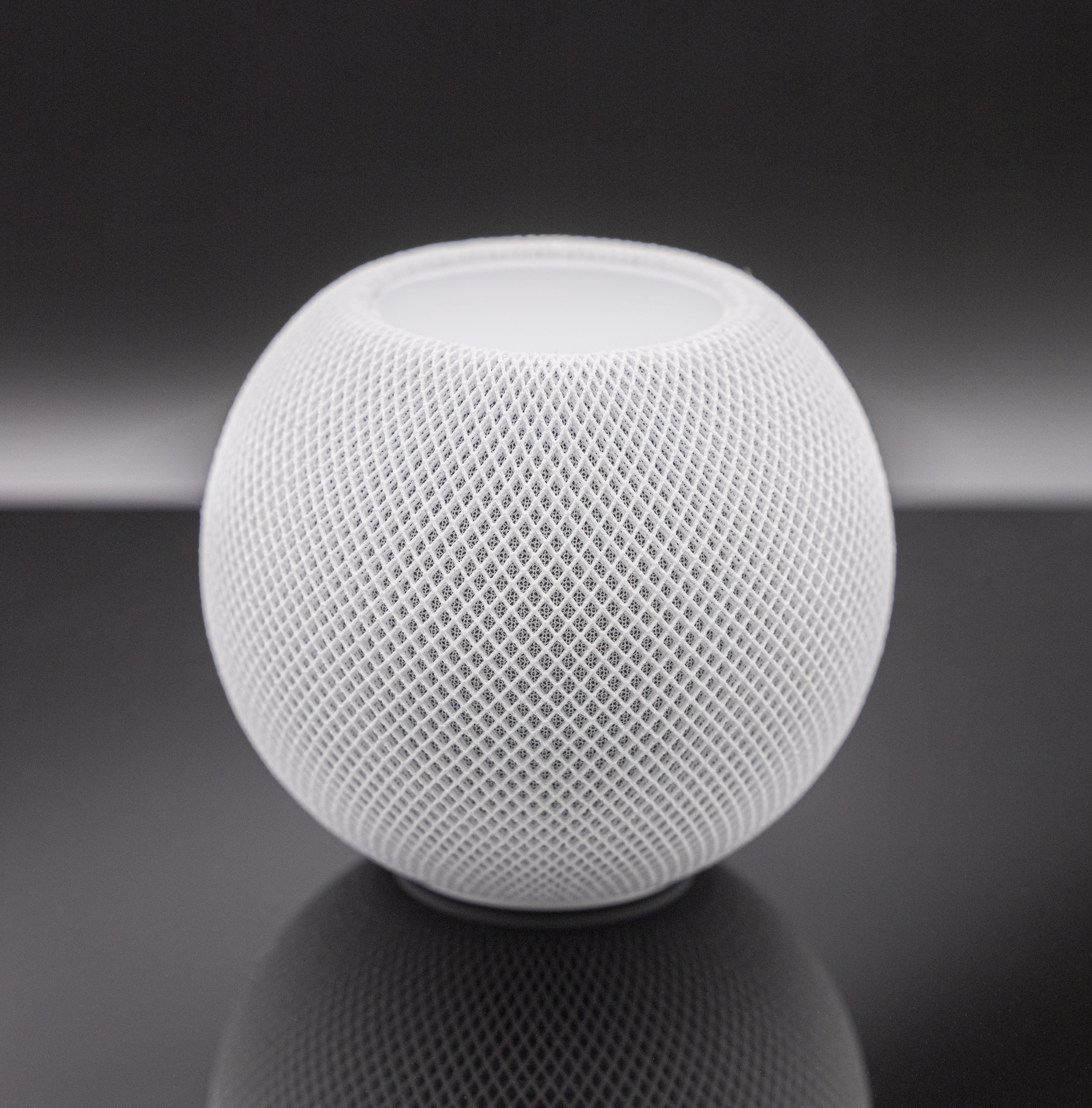
HomePod Mini

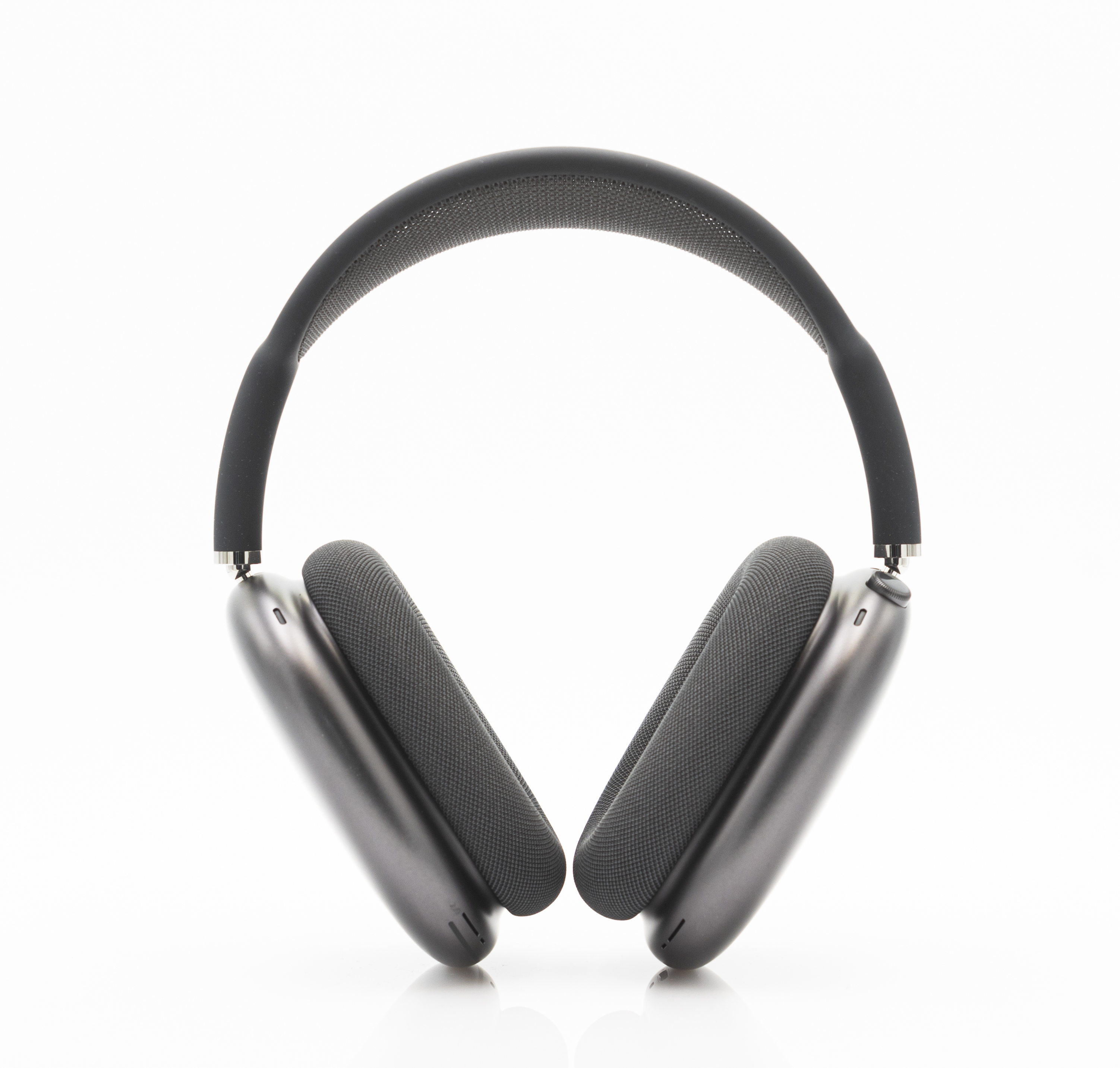
AirPods Max

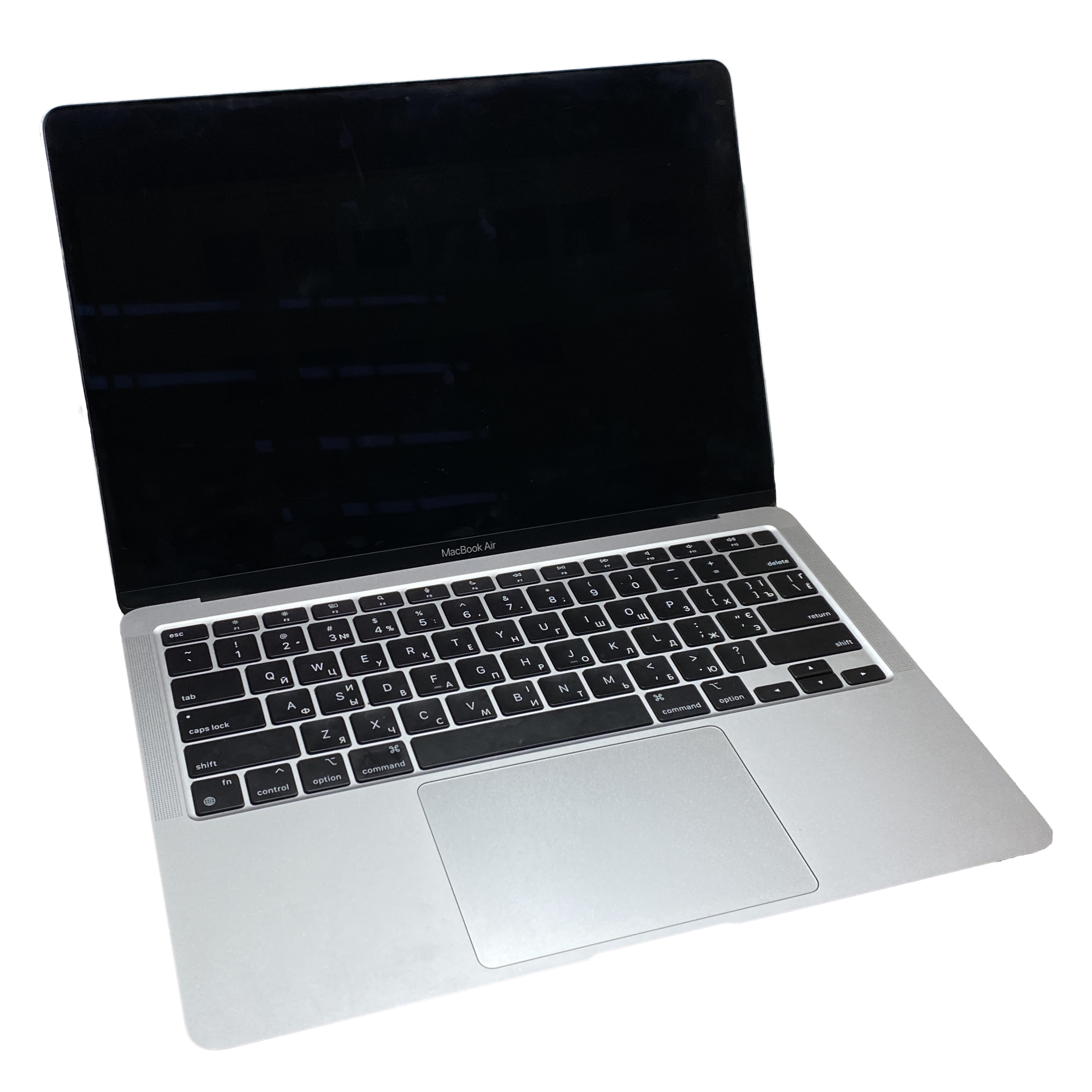
MacBook Air (M1)

Released	Model	Family	Discontinued
March 18, 2020	iPad Pro 11-inch (2nd generation)	iPad Pro	April 20, 2021
March 18, 2020	iPad Pro 12.9-inch (4th generation)	iPad Pro	April 20, 2021
March 18, 2020	Magic Keyboard for iPad	Keyboards	March 4, 2025
March 18, 2020	MacBook Air (Retina, 13-inch, 2020)	MacBook Air	November 17, 2020
April 24, 2020	iPhone SE (2nd generation)	iPhone	March 8, 2022
May 4, 2020	MacBook Pro (13-inch, 2020, Four Thunderbolt 3 ports)	MacBook Pro	October 18, 2021
May 4, 2020	MacBook Pro (13-inch, 2020, Two Thunderbolt 3 ports)	MacBook Pro	November 17, 2020
August 4, 2020	iMac (Retina 5K, 27-inch, 2020)	iMac	March 8, 2022
September 18, 2020	Apple Watch Series 6	Apple Watch	October 8, 2021
September 18, 2020	Apple Watch Hermès Series 6	Apple Watch	October 8, 2021
September 18, 2020	Apple Watch Nike Series 6	Apple Watch	October 8, 2021
September 18, 2020	Apple Watch SE (1st generation)	Apple Watch	September 7, 2022
September 18, 2020	iPad (8th generation)	iPad	September 14, 2021
October 23, 2020	iPad Air (4th generation)	iPad Air	March 8, 2022
October 23, 2020	iPhone 12	iPhone	September 12, 2023
October 23, 2020	iPhone 12 Pro	iPhone	September 14, 2021
November 13, 2020	iPhone 12 mini	iPhone	September 7, 2022
November 13, 2020	iPhone 12 Pro Max	iPhone	September 14, 2021
November 13, 2020	MagSafe Charger (15 W)	iPhone accessories	September 9, 2024
November 13, 2020	MagSafe Duo Charger	iPhone accessories	September 12, 2023
November 16, 2020	HomePod Mini (white)	Speakers	October 13, 2026
November 16, 2020	HomePod Mini (space gray)	Speakers	July 15, 2024
November 17, 2020	Mac Mini (M1, 2020)	Mac Mini	January 17, 2023
November 17, 2020	MacBook Air (M1, 2020)	MacBook Air	March 4, 2024
November 17, 2020	MacBook Pro (13-inch, M1, 2020)	MacBook Pro	June 6, 2022
December 15, 2020	AirPods Max (first generation, Lightning)	Headphones	September 9, 2024

==== 2021 ====
AirTag

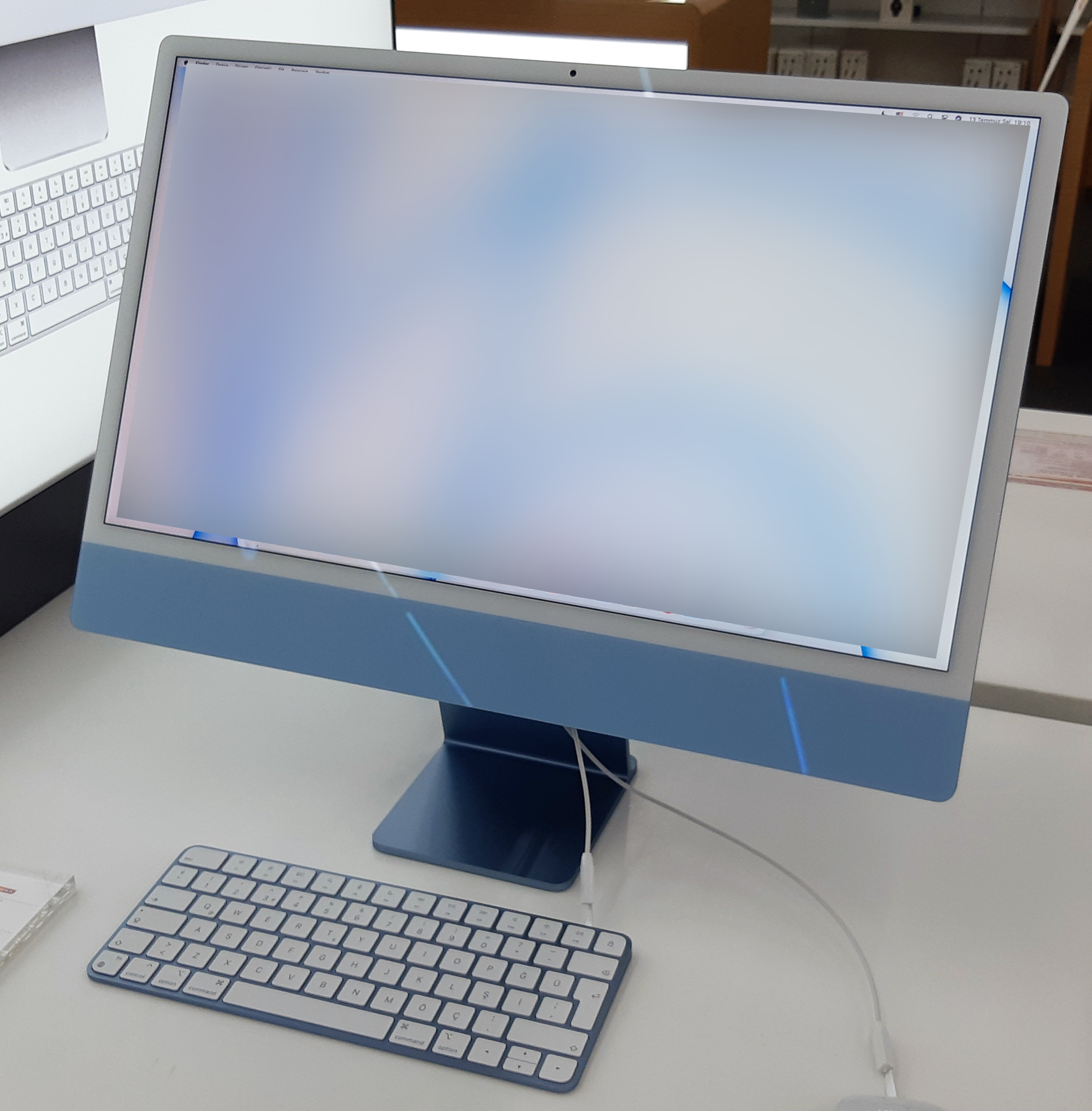
iMac (M1)

Released	Model	Family	Discontinued
April 30, 2021	AirTag (1st generation)	iPhone accessories	January 26, 2026
May 21, 2021	Apple TV 4K (2nd generation)	Apple TV	October 18, 2022
May 21, 2021	Siri Remote (2nd generation)	Apple TV	October 18, 2022
May 21, 2021	iMac (24-inch, M1, 2021)	iMac	October 30, 2023
May 21, 2021	Magic Keyboard (second generation, Lightning)	Keyboards	October 28, 2024
May 21, 2021	Magic Keyboard with Touch ID (Lightning)	Keyboards	October 28, 2024
May 21, 2021	Magic Keyboard with Touch ID and Numeric Keypad (Lightning)	Keyboards	October 28, 2024
May 21, 2021	iPad Pro 11-inch (3rd generation)	iPad Pro	October 18, 2022
May 21, 2021	iPad Pro 12.9-inch (5th generation)	iPad Pro	October 18, 2022
July 13, 2021	MagSafe Battery Pack	iPhone accessories	September 12, 2023
September 24, 2021	iPad (9th generation)	iPad	May 7, 2024
September 24, 2021	iPad Mini (6th generation)	iPad mini	October 15, 2024
September 24, 2021	iPhone 13	iPhone	September 9, 2024
September 24, 2021	iPhone 13 Mini	iPhone	September 12, 2023
September 24, 2021	iPhone 13 Pro	iPhone	September 7, 2022
September 24, 2021	iPhone 13 Pro Max	iPhone	September 7, 2022
October 8, 2021	Apple Watch Series 7	Apple Watch	September 7, 2022
October 26, 2021	AirPods (3rd generation)	Headphones	September 9, 2024
October 26, 2021	MagSafe Charging Case for AirPods Pro	Headphones	September 7, 2022
October 26, 2021	MacBook Pro (14-inch, 2021)	MacBook Pro	January 17, 2023
October 26, 2021	MacBook Pro (16-inch, 2021)	MacBook Pro	January 17, 2023
October 26, 2021	Polishing Cloth	Cleaning aid	August 25, 2026
November 1, 2021	HomePod Mini (yellow, orange, blue)	Speakers	October 13, 2026

==== 2022 ====
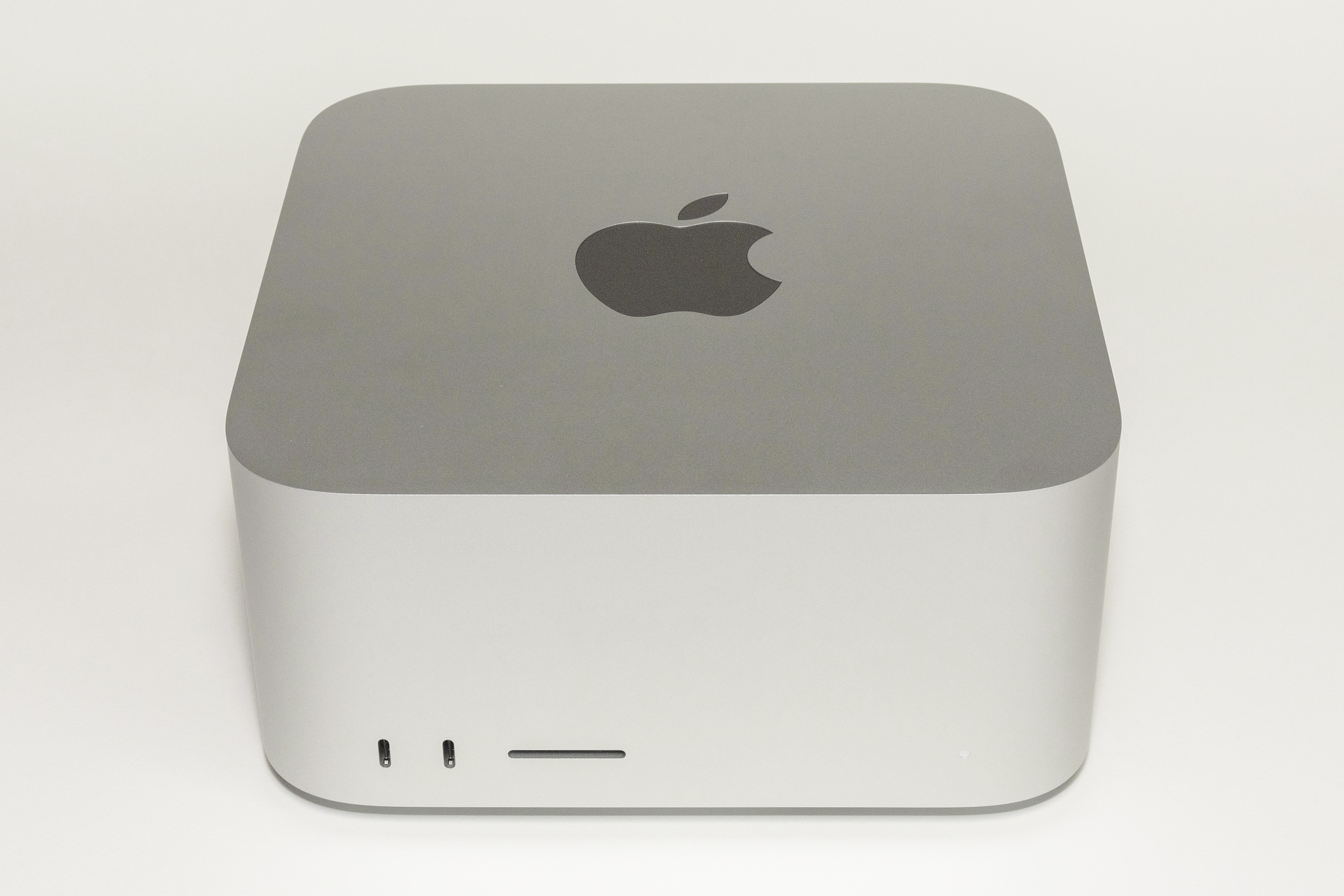
Mac Studio, first released March 18, 2022

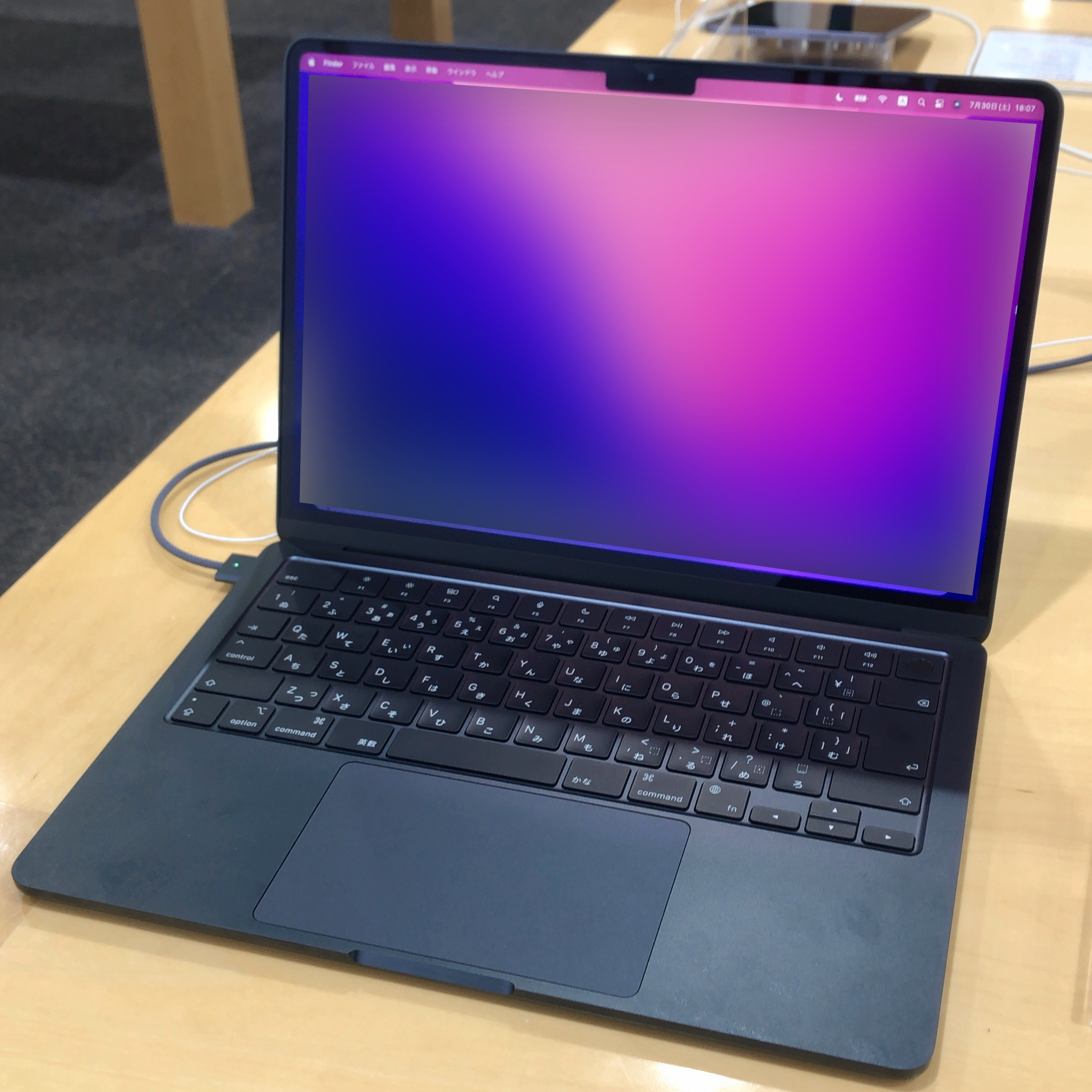
MacBook Air (M2)

Released	Model	Family	Discontinued
March 18, 2022	Studio Display (2022)	Displays	March 3, 2026
March 18, 2022	iPad Air (5th generation)	iPad	May 7, 2024
March 18, 2022	iPhone SE (3rd generation)	iPhone	February 19, 2025
March 18, 2022	Mac Studio (2022)	Mac Studio	June 5, 2023
June 24, 2022	MacBook Pro (13-inch, M2, 2022)	MacBook Pro	October 30, 2023
July 15, 2022	MacBook Air (M2, 2022)	MacBook Air	March 5, 2025
September 16, 2022	Apple Watch Series 8	Apple Watch	September 12, 2023
September 16, 2022	Apple Watch SE (2nd generation)	Apple Watch	September 9, 2025
September 16, 2022	iPhone 14	iPhone	February 19, 2025
September 16, 2022	iPhone 14 Pro	iPhone	September 12, 2023
September 16, 2022	iPhone 14 Pro Max	iPhone	September 12, 2023
September 23, 2022	AirPods Pro (2nd generation, Lightning)	Headphones	September 12, 2023
September 23, 2022	Apple Watch Ultra	Apple Watch	September 12, 2023
October 7, 2022	iPhone 14 Plus	iPhone	February 19, 2025
October 26, 2022	Magic Keyboard Folio	Keyboards	current
October 26, 2022	iPad (10th generation)	iPad	March 4, 2025
October 26, 2022	iPad Pro 11-inch (4th generation)	iPad Pro	May 7, 2024
October 26, 2022	iPad Pro 12.9-inch (6th generation)	iPad Pro	May 7, 2024
November 4, 2022	Apple TV 4K (3rd generation)	Apple TV	October 13, 2026
November 4, 2022	Siri Remote (3rd generation)	Apple TV	October 13, 2026

==== 2023 ====
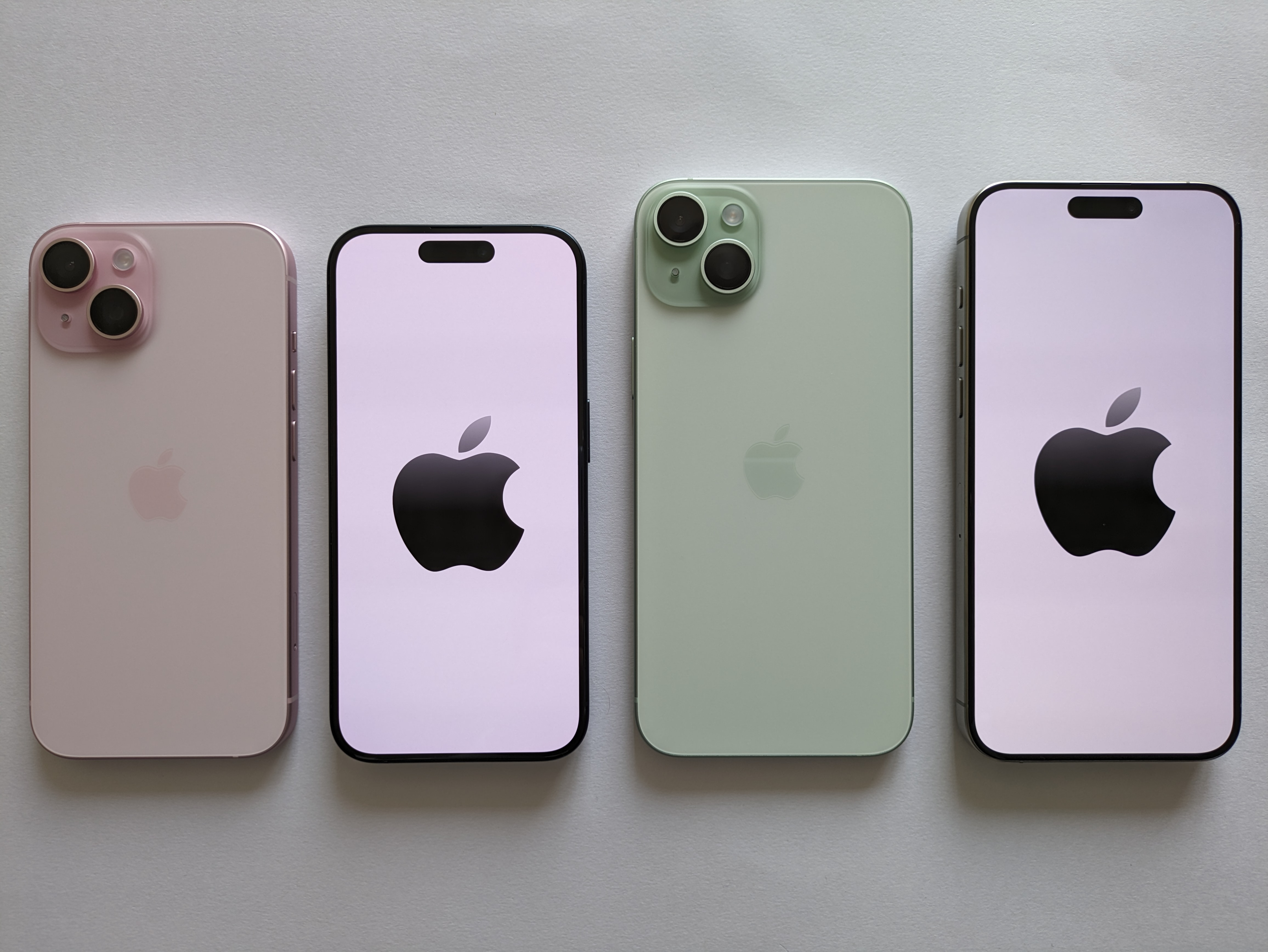
iPhone 15

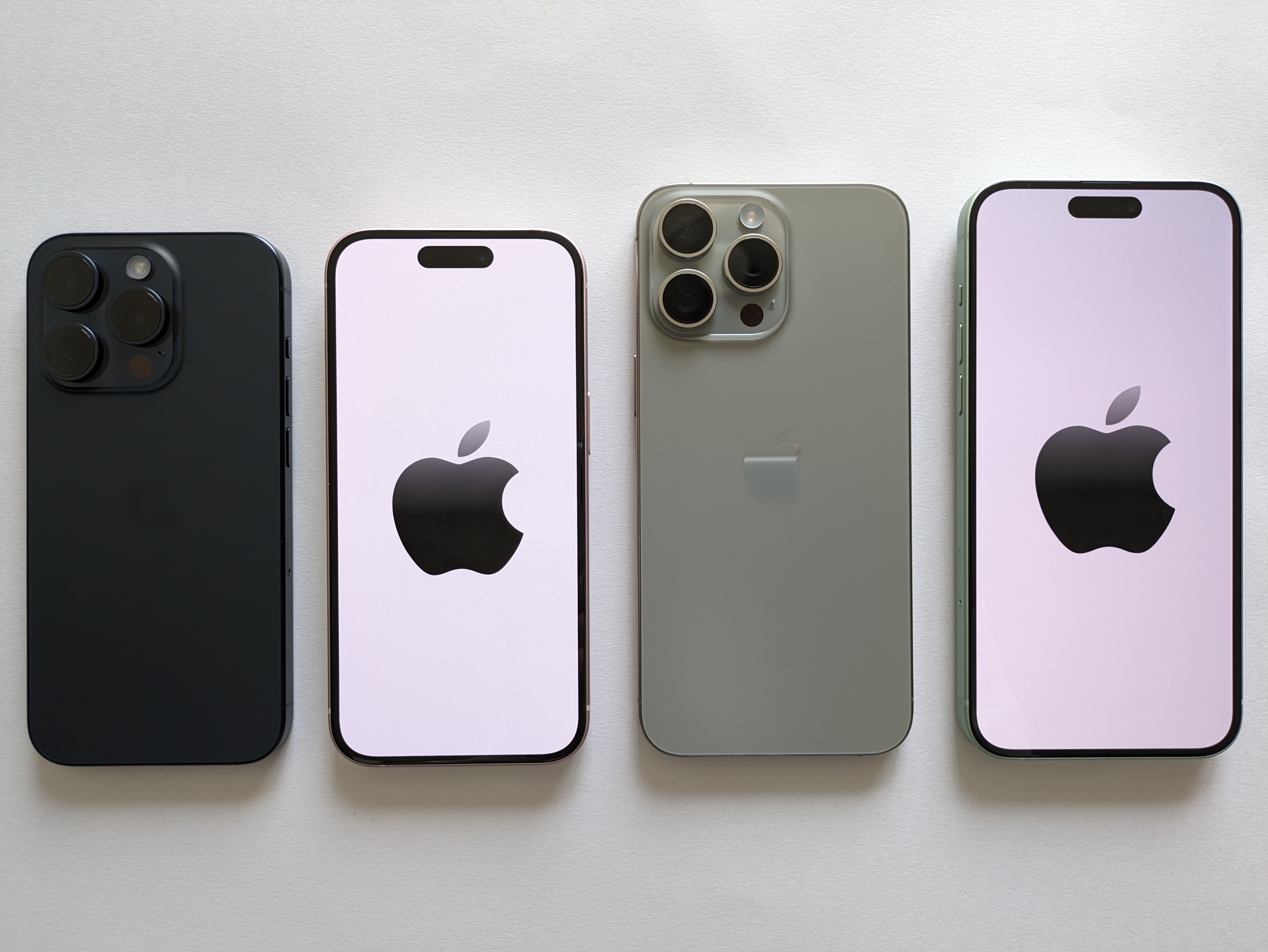
iPhone 15 Pro

Released	Model	Family	Discontinued
January 24, 2023	Mac Mini (2023)	Mac Mini	October 29, 2024
January 24, 2023	MacBook Pro (14-inch, 2023)	MacBook Pro	October 30, 2023
January 24, 2023	MacBook Pro (16-inch, 2023)	MacBook Pro	October 30, 2023
February 3, 2023	HomePod (2nd generation)	Speakers	current
June 13, 2023	Mac Studio (2023)	Mac Studio	March 5, 2025
June 13, 2023	Mac Pro (2023)	Mac Pro	March 26, 2026
June 13, 2023	MacBook Air (15-inch, M2, 2023)	MacBook Air	March 4, 2024
September 22, 2023	Apple Watch Series 9	Apple Watch	September 9, 2024
September 22, 2023	Apple Watch Ultra 2	Apple Watch	September 9, 2025
September 22, 2023	iPhone 15	iPhone	September 9, 2025
September 22, 2023	iPhone 15 Plus	iPhone	September 9, 2025
September 22, 2023	iPhone 15 Pro	iPhone	September 9, 2024
September 22, 2023	iPhone 15 Pro Max	iPhone	September 9, 2024
September 22, 2023	AirPods Pro (2nd generation, USB-C)	Headphones	September 9, 2025
September 22, 2023	EarPods (USB-C)	Headphones	current
November 1, 2023	Apple Pencil (USB-C)	Pencil	current
November 7, 2023	iMac (24-inch, M3, 2023)	iMac	October 28, 2024
November 7, 2023	MacBook Pro (14-inch, M3, Nov 2023)	MacBook Pro	October 30, 2024
November 7, 2023	MacBook Pro (14-inch, M3 Pro/M3 Max, Nov 2023)	MacBook Pro	October 30, 2024
November 7, 2023	MacBook Pro (16-inch, Nov 2023)	MacBook Pro	October 30, 2024

==== 2024 ====
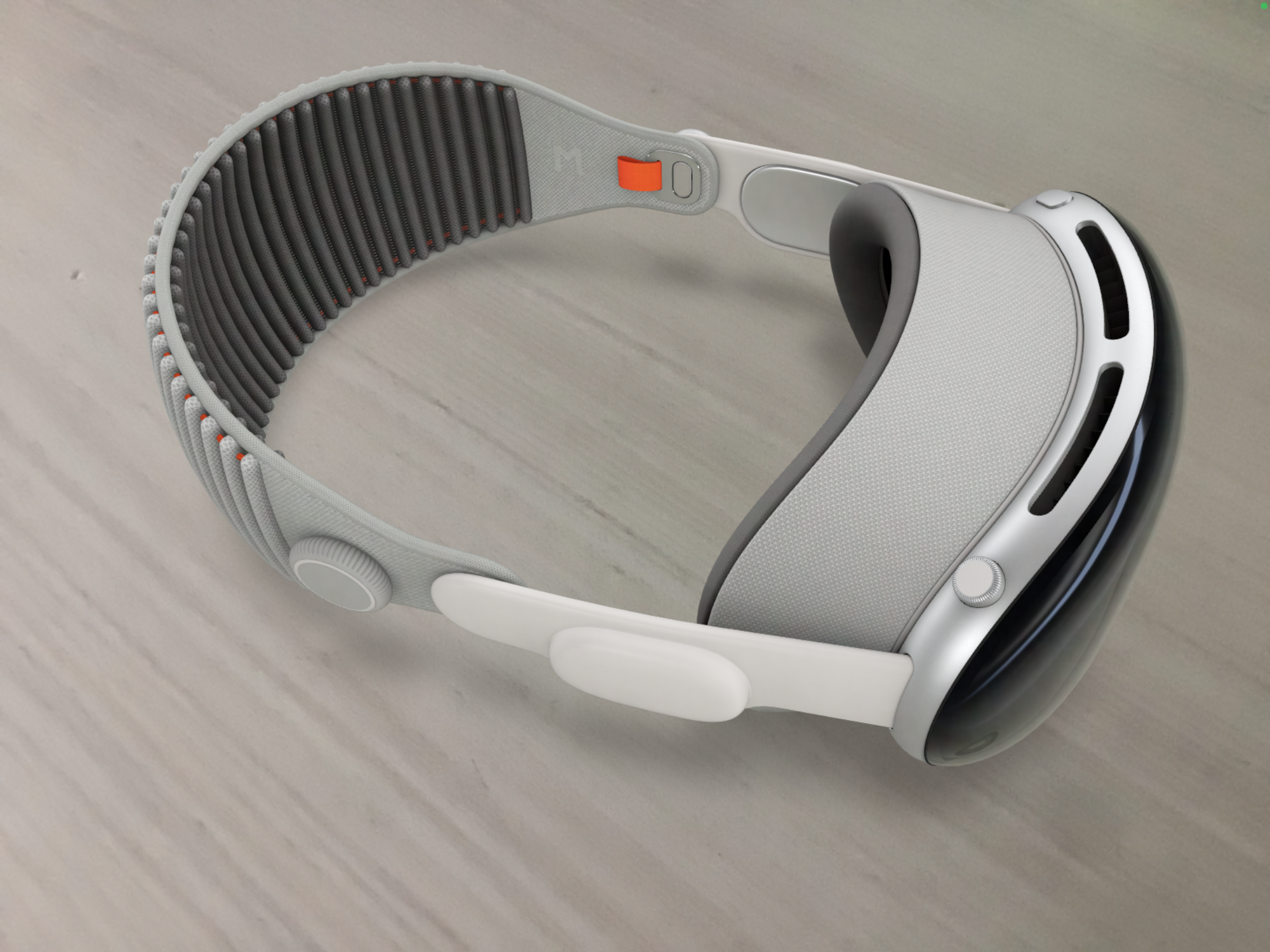
Apple Vision Pro

Released	Model	Family	Discontinued
February 2, 2024	Apple Vision Pro	Apple Vision Pro	October 15, 2025
March 8, 2024	MacBook Air (13-inch, M3, 2024)	MacBook Air	March 5, 2025
March 8, 2024	MacBook Air (15-inch, M3, 2024)	MacBook Air	March 5, 2025
May 15, 2024	Magic Keyboard for iPad Pro	Keyboards	current
May 15, 2024	Apple Pencil Pro	Pencil	current
May 15, 2024	iPad Air 11-inch (M2)	iPad Air	March 4, 2025
May 15, 2024	iPad Air 13-inch (M2)	iPad Air	March 4, 2025
May 15, 2024	iPad Pro 11-inch (M4)	iPad Pro	October 15, 2025
May 15, 2024	iPad Pro 13-inch (M4)	iPad Pro	October 15, 2025
July 17, 2024	HomePod Mini (midnight)	Speakers	October 13, 2026
September 9, 2024	MagSafe Charger (25 W)	iPhone accessories	September 9, 2025
September 20, 2024	AirPods 4	Headphones	September 9, 2026
September 20, 2024	AirPods Max (first generation, USB-C)	Headphones	March 16, 2026
September 20, 2024	Apple Watch Series 10	Apple Watch	September 9, 2025
September 20, 2024	Apple Watch Ultra 2 (black)	Apple Watch	September 9, 2025
September 20, 2024	iPhone 16	iPhone	current
September 20, 2024	iPhone 16 Plus	iPhone	September 9, 2026
September 20, 2024	iPhone 16 Pro	iPhone	September 9, 2025
September 20, 2024	iPhone 16 Pro Max	iPhone	September 9, 2025
October 23, 2024	iPad Mini (A17 Pro)	iPad mini	October 26, 2026
October 28, 2024	Magic Mouse 2 (USB-C)	Pointing devices	current
October 28, 2024	Magic Trackpad 2 (USB-C)	Pointing devices	current
October 28, 2024	Magic Keyboard (second generation, USB-C)	Keyboards	August 25, 2026
October 28, 2024	Magic Keyboard with Touch ID (USB-C)	Keyboards	August 25, 2026
October 28, 2024	Magic Keyboard with Touch ID and Numeric Keypad (USB-C)	Keyboards	August 25, 2026
November 8, 2024	iMac (24-inch, 2024)	iMac	October 27, 2026
November 8, 2024	Mac Mini (2024)	Mac Mini	August 25, 2026
November 8, 2024	MacBook Pro (14-inch, M4, 2024)	MacBook Pro	October 15, 2025
November 8, 2024	MacBook Pro (14-inch, M4 Pro/M4 Max, 2024)	MacBook Pro	March 3, 2026
November 8, 2024	MacBook Pro (16-inch, 2024)	MacBook Pro	March 3, 2026

==== 2025 ====
iPhone 17

Released	Model	Family	Discontinued
February 28, 2025	iPhone 16e	iPhone	March 4, 2026
March 12, 2025	Magic Keyboard for iPad Air	Keyboards	current
March 12, 2025	iPad (A16)	iPad	current
March 12, 2025	iPad Air 11-inch (M3)	iPad Air	March 2, 2026
March 12, 2025	iPad Air 13-inch (M3)	iPad Air	March 2, 2026
March 12, 2025	MacBook Air (13-inch, M4, 2025)	MacBook Air	March 3, 2026
March 12, 2025	MacBook Air (15-inch, M4, 2025)	MacBook Air	March 3, 2026
March 12, 2025	Mac Studio (2025)	Mac Studio	August 25, 2026
September 9, 2025	MagSafe Battery	iPhone accessories	current
September 9, 2025	MagSafe Charger (25 W Qi2)	iPhone accessories	current
September 19, 2025	AirPods Pro 3	Headphones	current
September 19, 2025	Apple Watch SE 3	Apple Watch	current
September 19, 2025	Apple Watch Series 11	Apple Watch	September 9, 2026
September 19, 2025	Apple Watch Ultra 3	Apple Watch	September 9, 2026
September 19, 2025	iPhone 17	iPhone	current
September 19, 2025	iPhone Air	iPhone	current
September 19, 2025	iPhone 17 Pro	iPhone	September 9, 2026
September 19, 2025	iPhone 17 Pro Max	iPhone	September 9, 2026
October 22, 2025	iPad Pro 11-inch (M5)	iPad Pro	current
October 22, 2025	iPad Pro 13-inch (M5)	iPad Pro	current
October 22, 2025	MacBook Pro (14-inch, M5)	MacBook Pro	October 27, 2026
October 22, 2025	Apple Vision Pro (M5)	Apple Vision Pro	current

==== 2026 ====
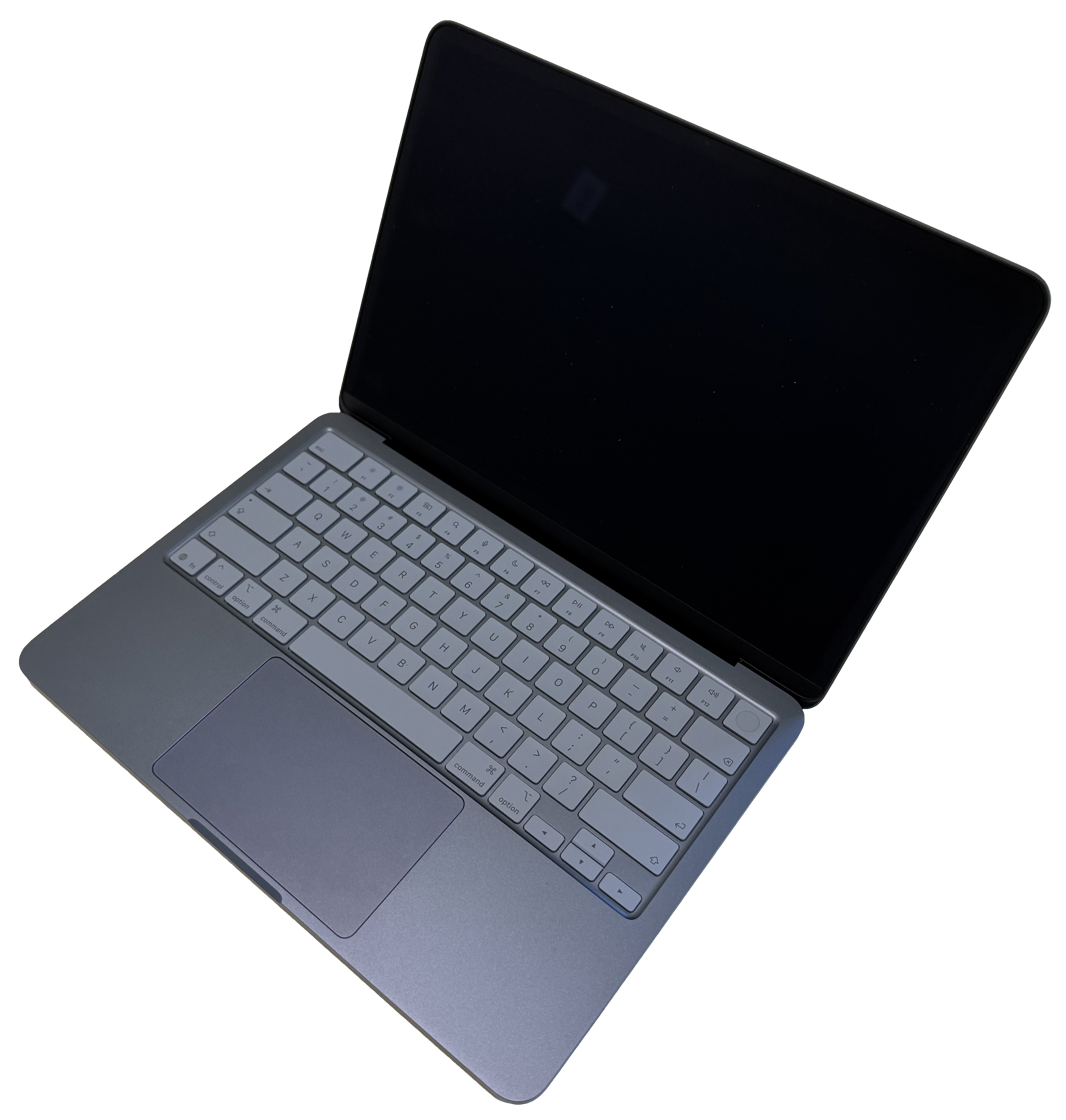
MacBook Neo

iPhone Duo

Released	Model	Family	Discontinued
January 26, 2026	AirTag (2nd generation)	iPhone accessories	current
March 11, 2026	iPad Air 11-inch (M4)	iPad Air	current
March 11, 2026	iPad Air 13-inch (M4)	iPad Air	current
March 11, 2026	iPhone 17e	iPhone	current
March 11, 2026	Studio Display (2026)	Displays	current
March 11, 2026	Studio Display XDR	Displays	current
March 11, 2026	MacBook Air (13-inch, M5)	MacBook Air	current
March 11, 2026	MacBook Air (15-inch, M5)	MacBook Air	current
March 11, 2026	MacBook Pro (14-inch, M5 Pro or M5 Max)	MacBook Pro	current
March 11, 2026	MacBook Pro (16-inch, M5 Pro or M5 Max)	MacBook Pro	current
March 11, 2026	MacBook Neo	MacBook Neo	current
April 1, 2026	AirPods Max 2	Headphones	current
August 25, 2026	Polishing Cloth (2026)	Cleaning aid	current
August 25, 2026	Magic Keyboard (2026, USB-C)	Keyboards	current
August 25, 2026	Magic Keyboard with Touch ID (2026, USB-C)	Keyboards	current
August 25, 2026	Magic Keyboard with Touch ID and Numeric Keypad (2026, USB-C)	Keyboards	current
September 18, 2026	AirPods 5	Headphones	current
September 18, 2026	Apple Watch Series 12	Apple Watch	current
September 18, 2026	Apple Watch Ultra 4	Apple Watch	current
September 18, 2026	iPhone 18 Pro	iPhone	current
September 18, 2026	iPhone 18 Pro Max	iPhone	current
September 22, 2026	Mac Mini (M6 or M5 Pro)	Mac Mini	current
September 22, 2026	Mac Studio (M5 Max or M5 Ultra)	Mac Studio	current
October 23, 2026	iPhone Duo	iPhone	current
October 30, 2026	HomePod Mini 2	Speakers	current
November 6, 2026	iPad Mini (A20 Pro)	iPad mini	current
November 6, 2026	iMac (24-inch, M6)	iMac	current
November 6, 2026	MacBook Pro (14-inch, M6)	MacBook Pro	current
November 6, 2026	MacBook Pro (14-inch PROLED XDR, M5 Pro or M5 Max)	MacBook Pro	current
November 6, 2026	MacBook Pro (16-inch PROLED XDR, M5 Pro or M5 Max)	MacBook Pro	current
November 13, 2026	Apple TV 4K (4th generation)	Apple TV	current
November 13, 2026	Siri Remote (4th generation)	Apple TV	current
November 13, 2026	Apple HomeView	Speakers	current

== Chart ==
List of Apple products
See also: Timeline of the Apple II series and List of Mac models

Products on this timeline indicate introduction dates only and not necessarily discontinued dates, as new products begin on a contiguous product line.

== See also ==
- Macintosh
- List of Mac models grouped by CPU type
- List of iPhone models
- List of iPad models
- Timeline of the Apple II family
- List of Mac models
