= Apple Pippin =

1996 video game console platform

Pippin

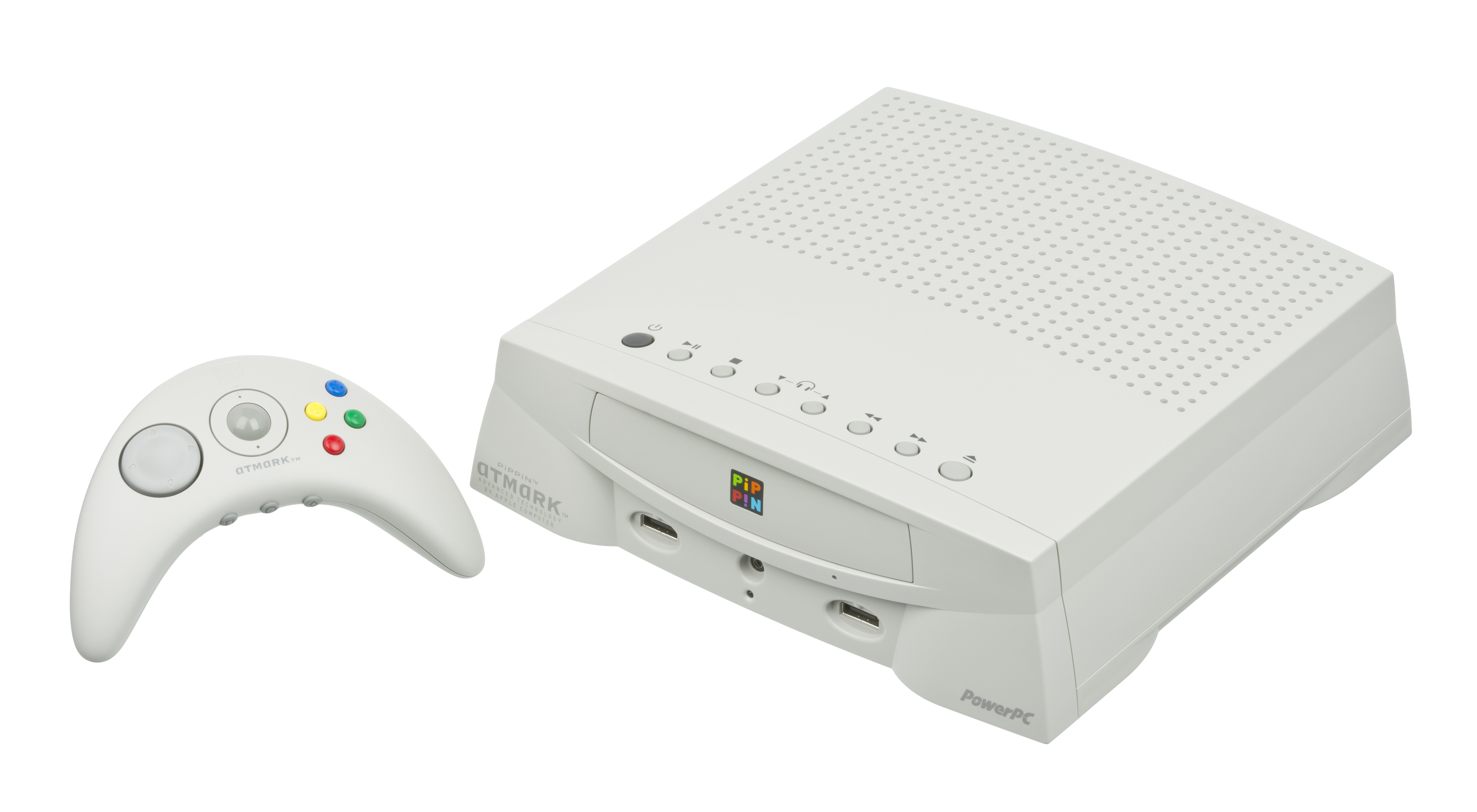
- Bandai Pippin console and its wireless controller
- Developer: Apple Computer
- Manufacturer: Bandai
- Type: Multimedia player platform for home video game console, Internet appliance and interactive kiosk development
- Generation: Fifth
- Released: JP: April 21, 1996; NA: November 4, 1996
- Lifespan: 1996–1998
- Introductory price: US$599 (equivalent to $1,200 in 2025)
- Discontinued: 1998
- Units sold: Worldwide: 42,000; Japan: 30,000; U.S.: 12,000
- Media: CD-ROM
- Operating system: Pippin OS (System 7.5.2)
- CPU: PowerPC 603 @ 66 MHz
- Display: 640x480, 8-bit and 16-bit color
- Sound: 16-bit, 44 kHz
- Predecessor: Playdia
- Successor: Apple Arcade

The Pippin (Japanese: ピピンアットマーク; stylized as PiPP!N) is a defunct open multimedia technology platform, designed by Apple Computer. According to Apple, Pippin was directed at the home market as "an integral part of the consumer audiovisual, stereo, and television environment".

Pippin is based on the Macintosh platform, including the classic Mac OS architecture. Apple built a demonstration device based on Pippin called Pippin Power Player and used it to demonstrate the platform at trade shows and to the media, to attract potential software developers and hardware manufacturers. Apple licensed the Pippin technology to third-party companies. Bandai Company Ltd. developed the ATMARK and @WORLD models, and focused them on the gaming and entertainment business in Japan, Canada and the United States. Katz Media developed the KMP 2000, and focused it on vertical markets throughout Europe and Canada.

The Pippin was part of Apple's efforts during the 1990s to branch out beyond computers into consumer electronics. Other products from this period included the QuickTake digital cameras, PowerCD, Apple Interactive Television Box, and Newton personal digital assistants. None achieved widespread commercial success.

== Naming ==
The Pippin platform was named for the Newtown Pippin, an apple cultivar, a smaller and more tart relative of the McIntosh apple (which is the namesake of the Macintosh). According to Apple, it intended for Pippin to be more than just a platform for game consoles. "Apple believes that over time Pippin will take many forms, including home telecommunication devices and much more. Apple did not want to choose a name that would be specific for certain market space, as it will certainly appeal to many types of consumers and be shipped in a variety of forms from many manufacturers." It was initially named "Sweet Pea" during the initial planning of the console.

The word "pippin" was used by Apple prior to the Pippin platform. The Apple ProFile, an external hard disk drive for the Apple III and Lisa, used the codename Pippin during development.

== History ==
Apple never intended to release Pippin on its own. Apple intended to make the Pippin platform an open standard by licensing the technology to third parties, much like how JVC shared the VHS format in the 1970s. Relying on third-party companies to produce Pippin systems was a way to increase Macintosh's market share – a goal identical to Apple's clone attempt in the late 1990s. It even encouraged differentiation between systems, in order to encourage competition – as long as the systems stuck to Apple's reference design to avoid fragmentation. The licensees could improve their systems by improving industrial design, integrating telephony, improving video and audio capabilities, increasing memory capacity, and more.

=== Bandai and Apple ===
In 1993, Bandai wanted to deliver a scaled-down version of the Macintosh purely for CD-ROM game-playing. Bandai President and CEO Makoto Yamashina chose the Macintosh platform over other platforms available at the time.

In early 1994, Bandai approached Apple with the gaming console idea. The original design was based on a Macintosh Classic II 16 MHz Motorola 68030 running Macintosh system software. Apple's involvement would be to define the initial logic board design, and Bandai would provide the casing and packaging. This was considered the fastest delivery solution to market at a very reasonable return on investment for Apple and Bandai.

As Bandai specifically marketed its Pippin models as game consoles, many of the releases are games, entertainment software, or edutainment software. However, unlike conventional gaming consoles, the Pippin has no dedicated graphics or sound processors. Because the Pippin platform is based on Macintosh system software, graphic services such as 2D and 3D QuickDraw are available to developers. Early on, Apple encouraged hardware developers to produce 3D rendering hardware so that the RISC processor could be free for other processing. The MPEG codec is not supported by the system software, as QuickTime is the only video format supported by the platform.

Originally, Bandai never intended to develop a system with Internet connectivity. However, Apple and Bandai received customer feedback requesting a system with Internet connectivity. To make that possible, Apple incorporated a modem into the Pippin design. Two years earlier in 1992, Apple had already moved away from the older serial interface with an external Hayes-compatible modem on its Macintosh systems, and switched to a serial interface which included GeoPort – a serial data technology that allowed software to emulate a modem. Implementing GeoPort into the Pippin platform required Apple to make a major change in its design – moving away from the 68030 footprint and to a PowerPC footprint. Apple chose the PowerPC 603 32-bit processor, as it was designed to be a low-cost, low-end processor for embedded use.

On December 13, 1994, Apple announced the Pippin platform in Tokyo, and its partnership with Bandai. In March 1996, the white-colored Bandai Pippin ATMARK (ピピンアットマーク, Pipin Attomāku) went on sale in Japan at a price of 64,800 yen, which included a dial-up modem and four bundled CD-ROMs. Yamashina predicted 200,000 Pippin ATMARK systems would be sold in Japan within the first twelve months.

Once Bandai licensed Pippin from Apple, Apple made no effort to market the Pippin platform. All the marketing was to be done by the licensees. Bandai spent US$93 million in marketing alone to sell the Pippin line. As part of the licensing agreement, both Bandai and Katz Media were not allowed to use the term "computer" when marketing the Pippin systems, so that the systems would not be confused with Apple's own Macintosh product line. Apple expected to receive $20 from Bandai, Samsung, and other hardware vendors for each Pippin sold, and a couple of dollars for each software title.

In October 1995, the Nikkei reported that Mitsubishi Electric would follow Bandai as a licensee to the Pippin technology. Although Mitsubishi did not actually sign a license agreement with Apple, it did manufacture the systems for Bandai (and effectively, Katz Media) on an original equipment manufacturer basis.

Bandai originally planned to launch the Pippin in 1995, but the release was later pushed back to March 1996 for Japan and June 1996 for the US. The black-colored Bandai Pippin @WORLD (pronounced at-world) went on sale in the United States in June 1996 at a price of US$599.00. The @WORLD bundle included a six-month unlimited Internet account from PSINet at a cost of US$24.95 per month. Bandai predicted 200,000 Pippin @WORLD systems would be sold in Japan in its first twelve months, and 300,000 systems sold in the US within twelve months of being released there.

=== Developer marketing ===
To encourage software developers to create content for the Pippin platform, Apple attempted to sell the platform as being scalable, in that applications written, for example, the ATMARK or @WORLD would work in future models of Pippin. In Apple's Q&A document, Apple contrasted its scalability with the Nintendo system, where the "Nintendo 8-bit NES cartridges don't work on the 16-bit SNES." The CD-ROMs do not contain region protection so that releases made for the ATMARK would also run on the @WORLD. Apple also promised the developers that, "Apple has no intention or desire to enter the business of regulating an industry which should be encouraged to exercise freedoms needed by the creative artists which Apple wants to evangelize onto the platform. Apple will abide by whatever ratings systems are regulated by governments. Apple, where reasonable, will endorse those systems which reduce excessive oversight and permit the freedom to the artists." An example of this is the Yellows series by Akira Gomi; originally a book displaying nude Japanese women, it was converted to an electronic database.

Pippin application developers had to first register as Apple developers and receive the developer kits, and to receive discounts on equipment required for Pippin development, such as the Power Macintosh AV system. At the May 1995 World Wide Developers Conference (WWDC), details were made available to potential developers. Bandai also issued a "Pippin Security Key" in the Pippin hardware development kit, which when inserted into the AppleJack ADB port allowed an off-the-shelf Pippin system to bypass the authentication system when running non-authenticated CD-ROMs.

Merlin Media was contracted to produce Pippin demonstration CD-ROMs.

=== Network Computer Platform ===
On May 21, 1996, Oracle Corporation, along with 30 hardware and software vendors, announced an intent to build computers that are designed around the Network Computer platform. The idea was to design technology based on a Network Computer Reference Profile including diskless computers, commonly coded applications using languages such as Java, and interface with the Internet using common software such as Netscape Navigator. In May 1996, Apple became a partner in the network computing effort through Pippin. Katz Media attempted to use the network computer platform concept to push the Pippin to eliminate the floppy disk, the Pippin was about two years ahead of the iMac in this effort.

A June 1996 Pippin Special issue of Mac Fan magazine in Japan is dedicated entirely to Pippin.

=== Unfulfilled roadmap ===
Apple intended to grow the Pippin platform alongside the rest of the Macintosh line. In a July 1996 Apple developer publication, Apple's CEO Gil Amelio announced the Pippin 1997 Reference Platform, and suggested that the platform would include the latest Macintosh technologies, including IEEE 1394 or FireWire, and a 25-pin external SCSI port as standard interfaces. In May 1997, Bandai announced a docking station that would include Ethernet support at US$139.00, although such a peripheral was never made available.

In 1997, Bandai developed two prototype units and displayed them at the MACWORLD Expo/Tokyo '97 event. The Bandai ATMARK-PD was designed as a direct replacement of the original ATMARK footprint, and would have included an internal drive that can read a standard CD-ROM disc, and read and write to a magneto-optical WORM PD disk with 600 MB of storage capacity.

The Bandai ATMARK-EX was to feature a footprint similar to a Macintosh desktop unit. It was designed to include 8 MB of RAM (expandable to 40 MB) and the ability to utilize standard 72-pin EDO-DRAM modules, instead of the proprietary memory modules used in the ATMARK and @WORLD. The chassis can handle a half-sized PCI card internally. The displayed unit contains a PCI card-based Ethernet interface, and a built-in analog modem. An infrared-based ADB interface is in the prototype, for a new line of peripherals.

=== Katz Media Player 2000 ===
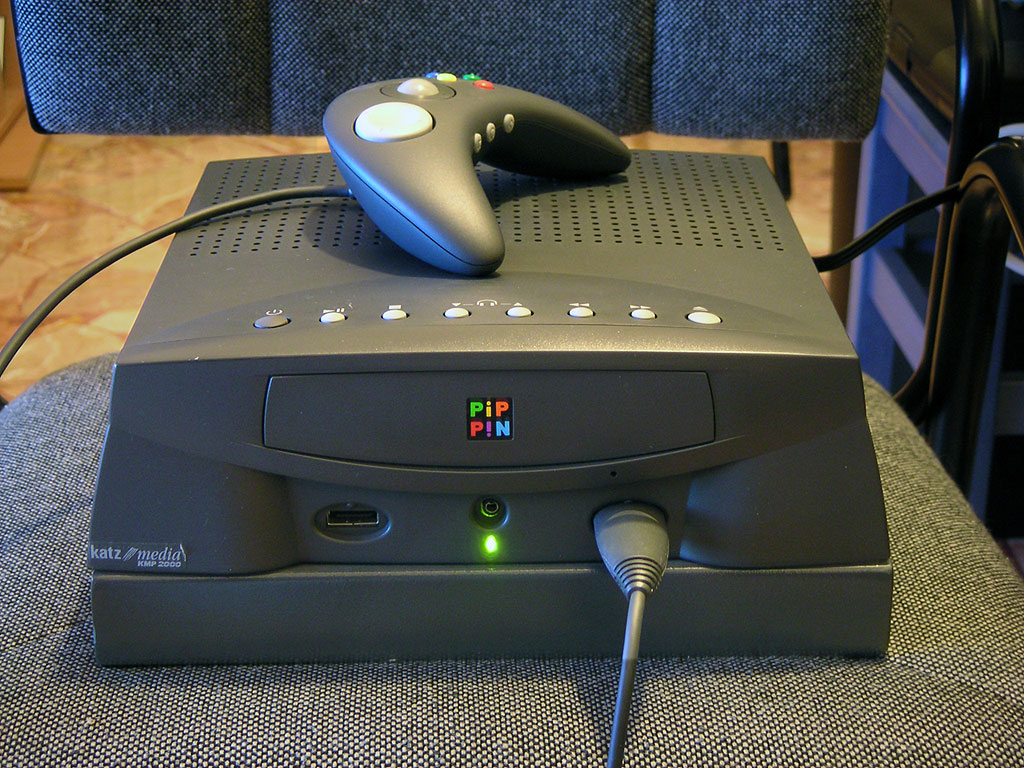
The Katz Media Player 2000 includes the generic docking station with PCI interface.

On June 4, 1996, Katz Media, based in Norway, became the second (and last) company to sign a license agreement with Apple to produce Pippin systems. While Bandai was targeting the Japan and United States markets, Katz Media focused on Europe and Canada. Because Katz Media was a media software-only company, it signed an agreement with Bandai so that Bandai would produce the hardware as an OEM for Katz Media.

Katz Media originally intended to produce two configurations of the Pippin: one as a basic multimedia system for running CD-ROMs, and a higher-end system supporting Internet access. The goal was to start shipping Pippin units in November 1996, but Katz Media did not actually start shipping their products until March 1997; it ended up producing only one model of the Pippin – the Katz Media Player 2000 (KMP 2000). The KMP 2000 was available in two configurations: with or without an external 50-pin SCSI interface on the back of the unit.

To develop content, Katz Media worked with a variety of multimedia developers and publishers to "Pippinize" their existing CD-ROMs and make them available for the Pippin.

Katz Media never sold the KMP 2000 in the retail market. Instead, it attempted to use the system as a set-top box for a television set or VGA display, to be distributed to its partners' respective client bases in order to interface with a variety of vertically marketed interests, such as catalogs, databases, Internet content, and so on. As a result, the KMP 2000 is the rarest of the Pippin systems, and is extremely difficult to find in today's used market.

Katz Media signed a number of agreements with companies across Europe and Canada. One agreement was to publish CD-ROM-based catalogs for Redwall Retail Stores, and use the Pippin as an interactive kiosk that would be set up in stores running the CD-ROMs. Katz Media also attempted to push the KMP 2000 into Canada – a country where, in May 1997, only 20 percent of its citizens had access to the Internet. The idea was to use the country's existing cable network to bring in Internet access, and the KMP 2000 was to be used as an Internet appliance that would be issued to subscribers. A hotel chain in Europe signed a deal with Katz Media to use the KMP 2000 in hotel rooms so that guests could access the Internet. Katz Media then signed with a hospital in France, using the KMP 2000 as an online system so that, as a team, physicians could pull up and review case studies, and collaborate on diagnoses and treatments. On June 16, 1997, the Netface Consortium in the Netherlands selected the KMP 2000 as the device to be used as a part of what the company called "the world's first Internet shopping mall." CAI-Westland owned a two-way cable system with 55,000 subscribers, and the KMP 2000 was to be given to the subscribers as a device to shop for products from a consortium of 23 companies.

=== Decline ===
By 1997, the Bandai @WORLD was extremely unpopular in the United States. Bandai canceled production of the Pippin during its merger discussions with Sega in early 1997, and after the merger was canceled, began rethinking its marketing strategy for the Pippin. This led to a short-lived, last resort attempt to market the Pippin as an all-in-one set-top box, but this approach failed. Bandai pulled the @WORLD out of the American market, and shipped the unsold units back to Japan. The black-colored units were re-branded ATMARK (without the ATMARK labeling on the front) and sold in the Japanese market.

By the time the Pippin systems were released, the market was already dominated by the Sega Saturn, Sony PlayStation, and the mostly Windows-based PC. In addition, although Apple made efforts to sign on software developers, there was little ready-to-use software for Pippin, the only major publisher being Bandai itself. The system's third-party developers consisted solely of small software houses. At a price of US$599 on launch, it was considered too expensive.

When Steve Jobs returned to Apple in 1997, he stopped all Macintosh clone efforts, which shut down the Pippin concept. Once Apple stopped all Pippin development, it affected all parties. Bandai stopped the production of all models of Pippin by mid-1997. Katz Media, who was receiving its systems from Bandai, vowed to continue supporting Pippin in a PR notice released June 25, 1997. Katz Media reportedly had some 100,000 units committed because of written agreements with companies spanning twenty countries. The company would eventually file for bankruptcy by the end of 1998. On February 27, 1998, DayStar Digital purchased all remaining inventory of hardware from Bandai and sold the inventory to anyone who would buy them. A former employee of DayStar placed sales of the Pippin through its distribution chain as high as 2,000 systems.

Bandai continued to support its consoles until December 31, 2002.

== Apple Bandai Pippin ==
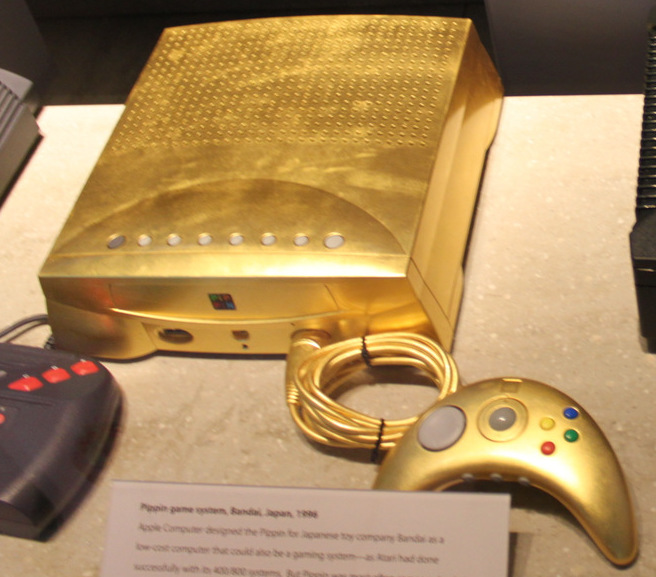
Gold Apple Bandai Pippin

The goal of the Bandai Pippin was to create an inexpensive computer system aimed mostly at playing CD-based multimedia software, especially games, but also functioning as a thin client. The operating system is a version of System 7.5.2, and is based on a 66 MHz PowerPC 603 processor and a 14.4 kb/s modem. It features a 4×-speed CD-ROM drive and a video output that can connect to a standard television display.

=== Marketing ===
In Japan, Bandai produced Pippin-based systems called the Pippin Atmark (ピピンアットマーク, Pipin Attomāku). Most of the Atmark systems use the same platinum color used on many of the Apple Macintosh models at the time.

In the United States and most parts of Europe, Bandai named the system the Bandai Pippin @WORLD (pronounced "at-world"). The @WORLD has the same specifications as the Pippin Atmark, but runs an English version of Mac OS. Most of the Western systems use a black color.

== System overview ==
=== Hardware ===
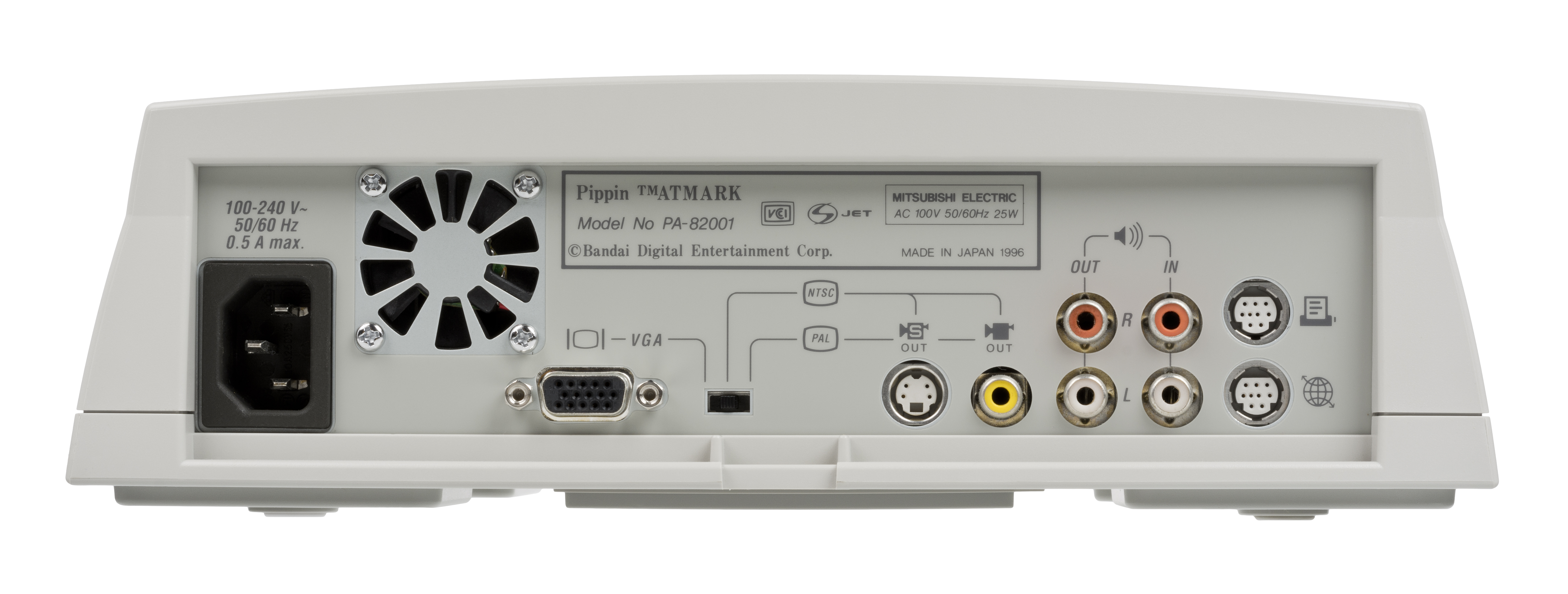
The rear panel of the Pippin has multiple A/V outs and printer and modem ports.

The Pippin platform is based on the PowerPC Platform, a platform designed and supported by IBM and Apple. The PowerPC 603 processor is based on RISC design, thereby allowing peripherals to rely on the Pippin CPU. For example, instead of relying on a fully-featured analog modem, the Pippin has a GeoPort serial port. Pippin supports generic dialup Internet service providers (ISP), which at the time included Prodigy, America Online, and eWorld.

The address bus of the PowerPC 603 can theoretically access memory up to 64 MB. However, the operating system's maximum addressable memory size is 37 MB. Furthermore, because of the ASIC design of the Pippin hardware, the maximum RAM size that can be added is 32 MB. Officially, Bandai produced memory upgrade modules of 2, 4, 8, and 16 MB. The memory chips are soldered onto a printed circuit board which is placed in a plastic housing, simplifying installation for the end user. Japanese hackers produced an aftermarket 16 MB module, but because the module was much larger than the memory module compartment on the Pippin, installation required removing the logic board from the chassis, and then mounting the large memory module in-between the logic board and chassis.

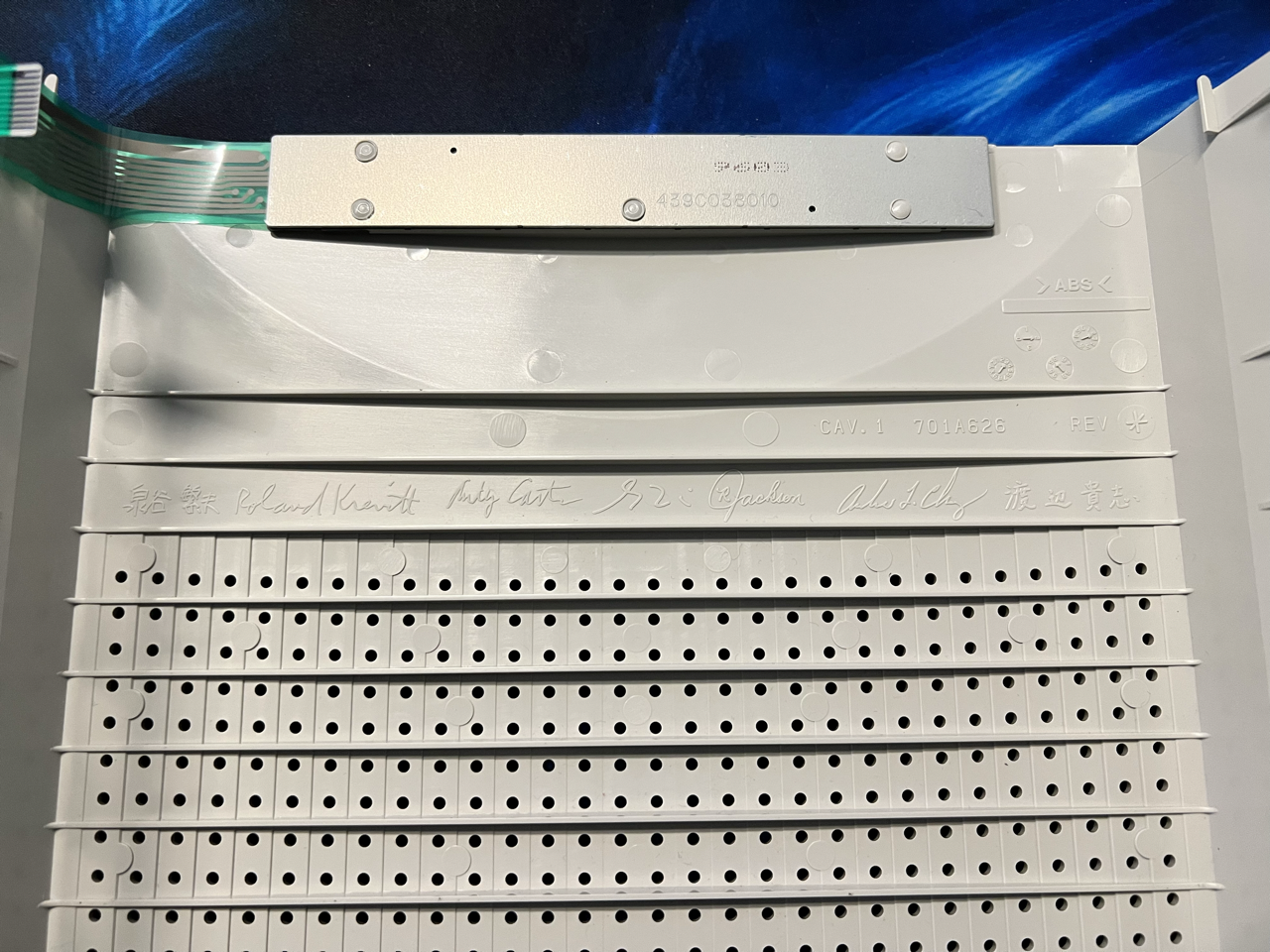
Developer signatures were embossed into the inside of the hard plastic top case.

Apple encouraged hardware developers to produce PCI compatible peripherals that could be added to the Pippin. The only official method of producing add-ons for the Pippin was by developing PCI-compatible devices and then placed in a docking station cabinet. A proprietary riser card interface (referred to by Apple as an X-PCI slot) is located on the bottom of a Pippin system and is used by docking stations. A docking station for a Pippin can contain a variety of hardware, such as SCSI or floppy disk drive controllers, video interfaces, codecs, or network interfaces such as Ethernet. The logic board passes PCI signals through the X-PCI docking interface, and then to the docking station. Docking stations within the Pippin line do not provide pass-through support, thereby limiting a Pippin system to use only one docking station at one time. For example, a docking station for a floppy disk drive would need to be removed in order to attach a docking station for the magneto-optical drive. Katz Media produced a generic docking station, containing a PCI slot, allowing a user to install PCI cards. No PCI-based peripherals were ever developed specifically for the Pippin.

The operating system is not located in the Pippin's onboard storage and resides instead on the CD-ROMs for each of the Pippin's software releases. Apple could thus upgrade the operating system without having to sell new hardware to the consumer. However, because of this, once Pippin software releases ended, it became impossible to upgrade to a later operating system or install extensions and such. The system automatically reboots whenever the CD-ROM eject button is pushed, so a user cannot load the system software from one CD-ROM, and then insert another CD-ROM. Apple intended for the Pippin platform to be an appliance, and encouraged consumers to purchase a fully featured Macintosh system if they were looking for something upgradable. Bandai never upgraded its system software beyond the 7.5.2 version. Hardware enthusiasts have been able to run system software as late as Mac OS 8.0, but this can only be done on a system utilizing a developer ROM-BIOS.

==== Technical specifications ====
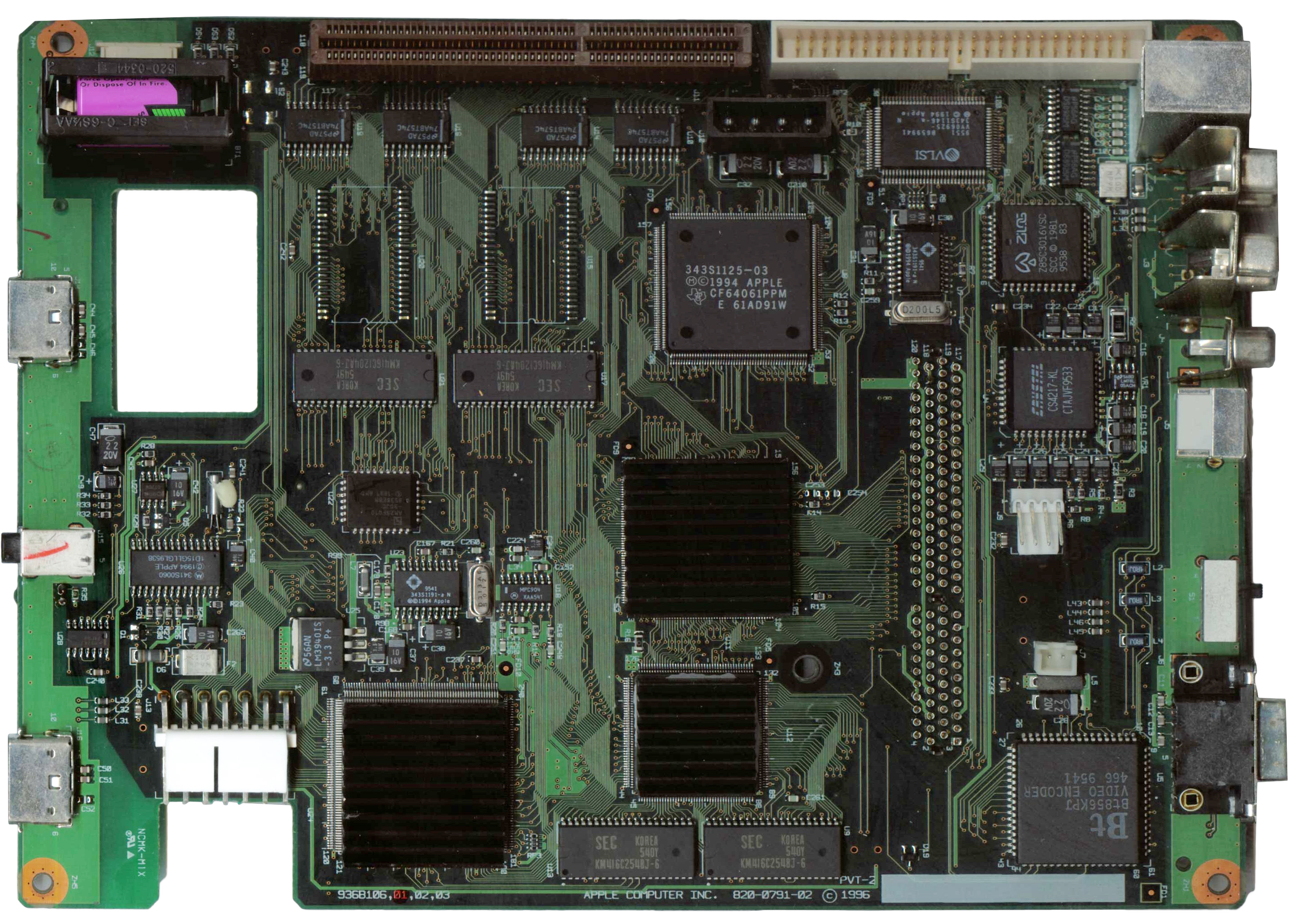
This Pippin logic board is in the Bandai systems. 6 MB is on the logic board by way of six 1 MB chips – four on the top, and two on the bottom.

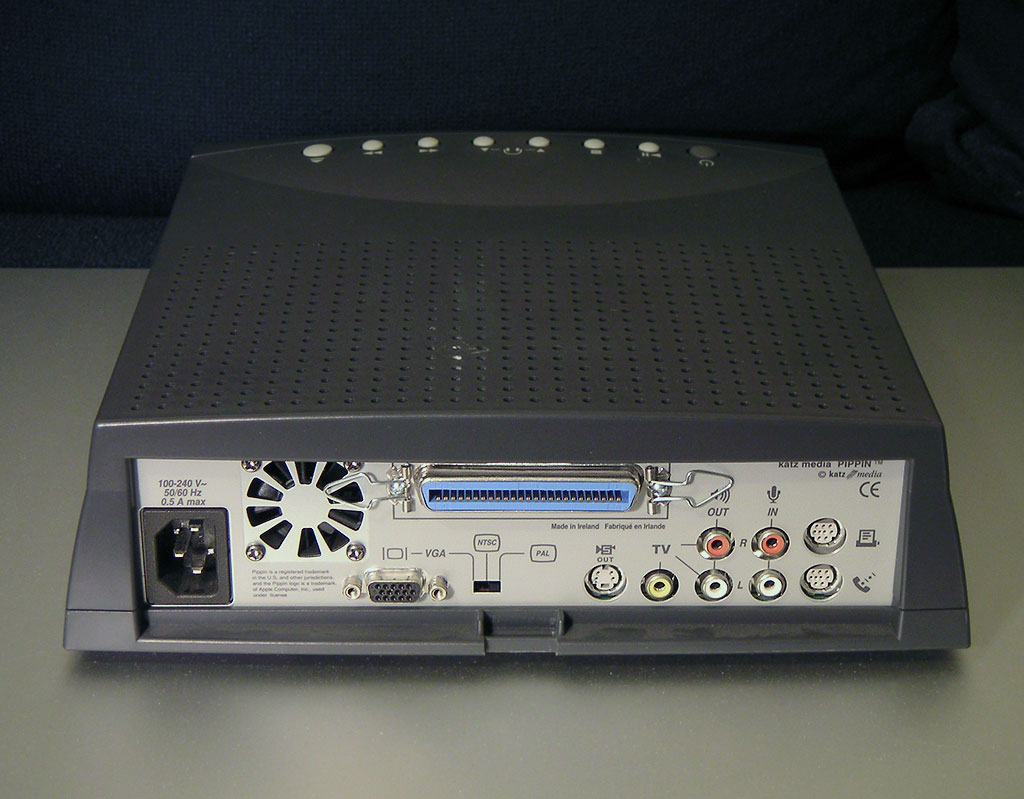
The rear of the Katz Media KMP 2000 has a unique external SCSI interface.

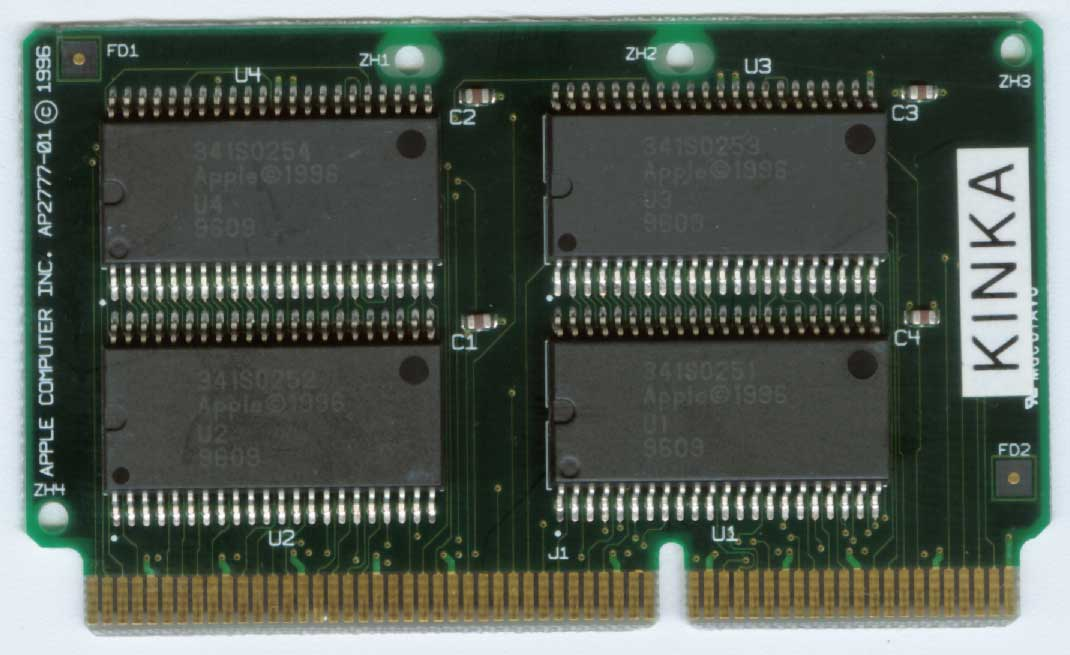
KINKA 1.0 ROM-BIOS

According to Apple, the loadout of a Pippin-based product was specific to each manufacturer. Other than the color, the specifications on the Bandai releases were the same across both the ATMARK and @WORLD packages, and the Katz Media release addressed features needed to be scalable, including an external SCSI interface, additional onboard memory, and the lack of RSA technology.

System	Bandai Pippin ATMARK	Bandai Pippin @WORLD	Katz Media Pippin KMP 2000
Model number	PA-82001	PW-10001	KMP 2000
Introduction	March 1996	October 1996	March 17, 1997
Discontinued	Summer 1997		
Processor	66 MHz PowerPC 603 RISC microprocessor		
On-board memory	6 MB combined system and video memory		8 MB combined system and video memory
Memory upgrades	RAM is upgradable in 2, 4, 8 and 16 MB increments		
NVRAM	128 KB NVRAM accessible storage space.		
Video Output	VGA, S-video, RCA composite video (NTSC/PAL switchable), with 640x480 resolution, 8-bit and 16-bit color.		
Audio In/out	RCA composite left/right stereo, 16-bit 44 kHz sampled, and headphone output jack		
Expansion	PCI expansion slot		PCI, and optionally external 50-pin Centronics SCSI interface
Input/Output	Two "AppleJack" ruggedized ADB inputs (P-ADB); Two high-speed serial ports; modem port is GeoPort ready		
Power supply	Internal universal switching power supply, 100 v 25 w 50/60 Hz 0.5 A		Internal universal switching power supply, 100–240 v 25 w 50/60 Hz 0.5 A
Notes	1996 - White; 1997 - Black	All units were black	Available with or without external SCSI

===== ROM-BIOS =====
Version	KINKA Developer	KINKA Pre-release	KINKA 1.0	KINKA 1.2	KINKA 1.3
Part number	AP2660-02	AP2735-01	AP2777-01	820-0867-01	AP2777-01
Chip labeling	16 flash ROM chips	341S0241 thru 245, 247, 248, 250	341S0251 thru 254	341S0297 thru 300	341S0328 thru 331
Support FDD	Yes	Yes	Yes	Yes	Yes
Support HDD	Yes	No	No	Yes	Yes
Support Zip 100	Yes	Yes	No	Yes	Yes
Support MO 230	Yes	No	No	Yes	Yes
Support PCI expansion adapter	No	No	No	No	Yes
Notes	Programmable; unstable	Only 500 parts were shipped	Common ROM-BIOS (JP)	Common ROM-BIOS (US)	Authentication disabled

===== Peripherals =====
Standard equipment in every Pippin package includes a dial-up analog modem (earlier packages included a 14.4 kbit/s modem (PA-82010 or PA-82007), and later packages included a 33.6 kbit/s modem (PA-82017/BDE-82017)) over a GeoPort interface and one corded AppleJack gamepad.

Originally, the expansion of the Pippin was to be by way of the docking station. However, Apple was looking forward to third-party manufacturers producing add-on products, such as PCMCIA slots, MPEG-2 codecs, among others. Some add-ons were made available by Bandai and other third-party manufacturers, this includes a docking station with a 3.5-inch floppy disk drive (PA-82002), a Deltis 230 MO Docking Turbo (MOS330P) with a 230 MB magneto-optical disk drive that is manufactured by Olympus Optical Co. Ltd. (requires KINKA 1.2 or later); and AppleJack wireless controller/gamepad (PA-82014/BDE-82014), and a Keyboard drawing pad stylus combination through the AppleJack ADB interface (PA-82003).

=== System software ===
On a typical PowerPC-based Macintosh system, the boot process includes loading a bootstrap loader from ROM, loading the Process Manager stored in the boot blocks of the startup device, locating a "blessed" System Folder on the startup device, and then loading Finder. However, because the Pippin platform ran only on non-writable CD-ROM, a modification to the boot process had to be made. For developers who were using standard 7.5.2 system software, a "PippinFinder" was installed into the System Folder, allowing the CD-ROM to be bootable on a Pippin-based system. Once development was finalized, PippinFinder was removed from the System Folder, and the Pippin-specific system software was placed onto the build. In addition, an alias of the main executable was placed into the Startup Items folder, so that upon bootup, the application will launch automatically. Developers are constrained to the base hardware profile of the Pippin platform, using no hard drive cache for downloaded content, and sharing 128 KB of NVRAM with the system.

The standard Finder interface was replaced with a simpler interface called "Pippin Launch". In Finder, the interface is based on folders and files. In Pippin Launch, the icons are clickable squares, and the user does not have access to standard Finder features, such as "New Folder".

Among developers, "Pippinized" is a reference to creating CD-ROMs designed to boot on a Pippin device. The system and application software is prepared on the external hard disk drive, and with the use of a dongle available only to developers, is tested by booting off the hard disk drive on the Pippin system. After the CD-R is made, the disc had to be sent out to an authorized CD stamping house to be authenticated. RSA's public/private key system was used to create the authentication system on the Pippin platform.

Other than the RSA authentication and modified system files, according to Apple: "Yes, Pippin titles will play on Macintosh computers. If the titles are 68k based they will play on both Power Macintosh and 68k based Macintosh computers. If the titles are written in native PowerPC code they might also play on both platforms depending upon whether or not the developer chose to code in fat binaries or not."

System	Bandai Pippin ATMARK	Bandai Pippin @WORLD	Katz Media Pippin KMP 2000
Model number	PA-82001	PW-10001	KMP 2000
Introduction	March 1996	October 1996	March 17, 1997
Discontinued	Summer 1997		
Processor	66 MHz PowerPC 603 RISC microprocessor		
On-board memory	6 MB combined system and video memory		8 MB combined system and video memory
Memory upgrades	RAM is upgradable in 2, 4, 8 and 16 MB increments		
NVRAM	128 KB NVRAM accessible storage space.		
Video Output	VGA, S-video, RCA composite video (NTSC/PAL switchable), with 640x480 resolution, 8-bit and 16-bit color.		
Audio In/out	RCA composite left/right stereo, 16-bit 44 kHz sampled, and headphone output jack		
Expansion	PCI expansion slot		PCI, and optionally external 50-pin Centronics SCSI interface
Input/Output	Two "AppleJack" ruggedized ADB inputs (P-ADB); Two high-speed serial ports; modem port is GeoPort ready		
Power supply	Internal universal switching power supply, 100 v 25 w 50/60 Hz 0.5 A		Internal universal switching power supply, 100–240 v 25 w 50/60 Hz 0.5 A
Notes	1996 - White; 1997 - Black	All units were black	Available with or without external SCSI

==== ROM-BIOS ====
Version	KINKA Developer	KINKA Pre-release	KINKA 1.0	KINKA 1.2	KINKA 1.3
Part number	AP2660-02	AP2735-01	AP2777-01	820-0867-01	AP2777-01
Chip labeling	16 flash ROM chips	341S0241 thru 245, 247, 248, 250	341S0251 thru 254	341S0297 thru 300	341S0328 thru 331
Support FDD	Yes	Yes	Yes	Yes	Yes
Support HDD	Yes	No	No	Yes	Yes
Support Zip 100	Yes	Yes	No	Yes	Yes
Support MO 230	Yes	No	No	Yes	Yes
Support PCI expansion adapter	No	No	No	No	Yes
Notes	Programmable; unstable	Only 500 parts were shipped	Common ROM-BIOS (JP)	Common ROM-BIOS (US)	Authentication disabled

==== Peripherals ====
Standard equipment in every Pippin package includes a dial-up analog modem (earlier packages included a 14.4 kbit/s modem (PA-82010 or PA-82007), and later packages included a 33.6 kbit/s modem (PA-82017/BDE-82017)) over a GeoPort interface and one corded AppleJack gamepad.

Originally, the expansion of the Pippin was to be by way of the docking station. However, Apple was looking forward to third-party manufacturers producing add-on products, such as PCMCIA slots, MPEG-2 codecs, among others. Some add-ons were made available by Bandai and other third-party manufacturers, this includes a docking station with a 3.5-inch floppy disk drive (PA-82002), a Deltis 230 MO Docking Turbo (MOS330P) with a 230 MB magneto-optical disk drive that is manufactured by Olympus Optical Co. Ltd. (requires KINKA 1.2 or later); and AppleJack wireless controller/gamepad (PA-82014/BDE-82014), and a Keyboard drawing pad stylus combination through the AppleJack ADB interface (PA-82003).

=== System software ===
On a typical PowerPC-based Macintosh system, the boot process includes loading a bootstrap loader from ROM, loading the Process Manager stored in the boot blocks of the startup device, locating a "blessed" System Folder on the startup device, and then loading Finder. However, because the Pippin platform ran only on non-writable CD-ROM, a modification to the boot process had to be made. For developers who were using standard 7.5.2 system software, a "PippinFinder" was installed into the System Folder, allowing the CD-ROM to be bootable on a Pippin-based system. Once development was finalized, PippinFinder was removed from the System Folder, and the Pippin-specific system software was placed onto the build. In addition, an alias of the main executable was placed into the Startup Items folder, so that upon bootup, the application will launch automatically. Developers are constrained to the base hardware profile of the Pippin platform, using no hard drive cache for downloaded content, and sharing 128 KB of NVRAM with the system.

The standard Finder interface was replaced with a simpler interface called "Pippin Launch". In Finder, the interface is based on folders and files. In Pippin Launch, the icons are clickable squares, and the user does not have access to standard Finder features, such as "New Folder".

Among developers, "Pippinized" is a reference to creating CD-ROMs designed to boot on a Pippin device. The system and application software is prepared on the external hard disk drive, and with the use of a dongle available only to developers, is tested by booting off the hard disk drive on the Pippin system. After the CD-R is made, the disc had to be sent out to an authorized CD stamping house to be authenticated. RSA's public/private key system was used to create the authentication system on the Pippin platform.

Other than the RSA authentication and modified system files, according to Apple: "Yes, Pippin titles will play on Macintosh computers. If the titles are 68k based they will play on both Power Macintosh and 68k based Macintosh computers. If the titles are written in native PowerPC code they might also play on both platforms depending upon whether or not the developer chose to code in fat binaries or not."

=== Commercially released games ===
Regions released	Region description	Released
NA (North America)	North America and other NTSC territories.	?
PAL	PAL/SECAM territories: much of Europe and Australia.	?
JP (Japan)	Japan and other NTSC-J territories.	?

Title	Genre(s)	Developer(s)	Publisher(s)	Date first released	Regions released
@Card SD Gundam Gaiden	Card game	Bandai		1997	JP
AI Shogi	Board game	Something Good	Something Good	1996	JP
Anpanman no AIUEO-N!	Edutainment	Bandai	Bandai	1996	JP
Anpanman to Asobou! 1	Edutainment	Bandai	Bandai	1996	JP
Anpanman to Asobou! 2	Edutainment	Bandai	Bandai	1997	JP
Chibikko Club	Edutainment	Gakugei	Gakugei	1996	JP
Circus!	Edutainment	Matra Hachette Multimedia		1996	JP
CombiPark Tonde Mat	Rhythm; dance	Combi Corporation	Combi Corporation	1997	JP
Densha Daishuugou: Driving Train	Simulator	Bandai	Bandai	1996	JP
Dinosaur Museum	Educational; Includes mini-games alongside reference material.	Apollon Create	Bandai	1996	JP
Franklin the Turtle Learns Math	Edutainment	Sanctuary Woods	Sanctuary Woods	199?	JP
Funky Funny Aliens	Music	Amuse	Amuse	1996	JP
Gadget: Invention, Travel, & Adventure	Adventure	Synergy Interactive		1996	JP
Gakkō no Kowai Uwasa: Hanako-san ga Kita!!	Adventure	Amuse	Amuse	1996	JP
Gundam 0079: The War for Earth	Action	Presto Studios	Bandai Digital Entertainment	199?	JP
Gundam Tactics: Mobility Fleet 0079	Strategy	DigiCube	JVC Advanced Media	1996	JP
Gus Goes to Cyberopolis	Edutainment	Modern Media Ventures		1996	JP
Gus Goes to the Kooky Carnival in search of Rant	Edutainment	Modern Media Ventures		1996	JP
Jungle Park	Adventure	Digitalogue	Bandai Digital Entertainment	1996	JP
Kids Box	Edutainment	Aloalo International	ASK Kodansha	1996	JP
L-Zone	Adventure	Synergy, Infocity	Synergy	1996	JP
Mobile Suit Gundam: White Base – The 13th Independent Force	Strategy	JVC Advanced Media		1997	JP
Mr. Potato Head Saves Veggie Valley	Adventure	Duck Soup Productions Inc., Turning Point Software	Bandai Digital Entertainment	1996	NA
Music ISLAND vol.1: Peter and the Wolf	Edutainment	Oracion	Oracion	1996	JP
Music ISLAND vol.2: The Nutcracker	Edutainment	Oracion	Oracion	1996	JP
Music ISLAND vol.3: The Four Seasons	Edutainment	Oracion	Oracion	1996	JP
Music ISLAND vol.4: Carnival of the Animals	Edutainment	Oracion	Oracion	1996	JP
Narabete! Tsukkute! Ugoku Block	Creative construction; edutainment	Bandai Digital Entertainment	Bandai	1996	JP
Nemurenu Yoru no Chiisana Ohanashi	Adventure	Amuse	Amuse	199	JP
Nobunaga's Ambition Returns	Strategy	Koei	Bandai Digital Entertainment	1996	JP
Odotte AIUEO	Educational; Teaches Japanese characters through mini-games.	Tom Create	Emotion Digital Software	1997	JP
Picture Book of Mission School Uniform	Quiz; dress-up Includes quizzes and dress-up activities alongside reference material.	Shikanen	Emotion Digital Software	1996	JP
Playskool Puzzles	Puzzle	ImageBuilder Software		1996	NA
Power Nazoler	Edutainment	Infortech	Infortech	1996	JP
Power Rangers Zeo Versus The Machine Empire	Action	CyberFlix		1996	NA
Racing Days	Racing	Kitt Peak		1996	NA, JP
Randoseru Shougakkou 1-Nensei	Edutainment	Gakugei	Gakugei	1996	JP
SD Gundam Wars	Strategy	Bandai		1997	JP
SD Ultraman's Challenge! Maze Island	Maze; action-puzzle	Bandai		1996	JP
SeesawC 1: My favorite things 120	Edutainment	Ai Ga Areba Daijobu	Bandai	1996	JP
SeesawC 2: My favorite places 400	Edutainment	Ai Ga Areba Daijobu	Bandai	1996	JP
Shockwave Assault	Combat flight simulation; shooter; compilation Contains Shock Wave and its Operation Jumpgate expansion.	Electronic Arts	Electronic Arts Victor	1996	JP
Super Marathon	First-person shooter; compilation Contains Marathon and Marathon 2: Durandal.	Bungie		1996	JP
T-Break	Puzzle; peg solitaire	Infocity	Infocity	1996	JP
Tamagotchi CD-ROM	Simulation	7th Level	Bandai Digital Entertainment	1997	JP
Tetsuman Gaiden: Ambition of Great Game	Edutainment	Teichiku		1996	JP
The Journeyman Project: Pegasus Prime	Adventure	Presto Studios	Bandai Digital Entertainment	1997	NA, JP
Thomas the Tank Engine & Friends	Edutainment	Bandai		1996	JP
Tropic Island	Pinball	Momodera's Brand	Momodera's Brand	1996	JP
Tunin'Glue	Music; music creation	NanaOn-Sha	Bandai Digital Entertainment	1996	JP
Ultraman Quiz King	Game show	Bandai		1996	JP
Ultraman: The Digital Board Game	Board game	Bandai		1996	JP
Victorian Park	Adventure	F2, JVC Advanced Media	Bandai Digital Entertainment	1996	JP
Yellow Brick Road I	Adventure	Synergy	Synergy	1997	JP
Yellow Brick Road II: Glinda to Nishi no Majo	Adventure	Synergy	Synergy	1997	JP
Zukkoke Threesome: Drama Murder Case	Adventure	Poplar Publishing	Bandai Digital Entertainment	1997	JP

=== Non-game software ===
Title	Software type	Developer(s)	Publisher(s)	Year	Notes
1995.1.17: The Great Hanshin Earthquake	Photographic memorial; slideshow	Keikakudo		1996	JP
@WORLD Basics	Web Tool			1996	NA
@WORLD Browser	Web Tool	Spyglass, Inc.		1996	NA
@WORLD Registration	Web Tool	Bandai Digital Entertainment		1996	NA
Action Designer: Ultraman Tiga	Art Editor	Magic Mouse		1997	JP
ad.hoc Medical Practice Quick Training Course	Professional training	ad.hoc Co., Ltd.		1998	JP
Anime Designer: Dragon Ball Z	Drawing and animation software	Magic Mouse		1996	JP
Apple PIPPIN Macworld Presentation & Demo	Utility Software	Merlin Media		1996	NA
Atmark Town	Web Tool	Bandai Digital Entertainment		1996	JP
B no Kaidan	Multimedia Tool	Bandai	Bandai	1996	JP
Better Homes and Gardens Cool Crafts	Arts and crafts instruction	CD Vision	Multicom Publishing	1996	NA
Book of Lulu, The	Interactive storybook	Ariadne	Organa	1996	JP
Chisato Moritaka CD-ROM Watarase Bashi	Interactive music album; artist reference	Oracion		1996	JP
CineNoir	Video montage creation		Bandai Digital Entertainment	1996	NA
Compton's Interactive Encyclopedia: @World Edition	Edutainment	SoftKey Multimedia		1996	NA
Dazzeloids	Interactive storybook	Center for Advanced Whimsy	Voyager Company	1996	JP
EGWORD Pure	Word processor		Bandai Digital Entertainment	1996	JP
Epson Colorio Club Print Sample Kit	Utility Software	O2 Interactive		1997	JP
Exotic Sushi	Edutainment	Electric Dreams		1996	NA
Fair, then Partly Piggy	Interactive storybook; language learning	Studio Flagship	Studio Flagship	1996	JP
Fortullia	Fortune-telling; astrology		Bandai Digital Entertainment	1996	JP
Franky Online	Web Tool	Future Pirates		1996	JP
Gokigen Mama no Omakase Diary	Electronic diary; personal organizer	NanaOn-Sha		1996	JP
Gundam Virtual Modeler Light	Art Tool	Expression Tools		1996	JP
Histoires d'Urologie	Edutainment	MELOdY		1999	PAL
Home Improvement 1-2-3	Multimedia Tool	Multicom Publishing		1996	NA
Internet Kit	Web Tool	Netscape Communications		1996	JP
Introducing "Forester" CD-ROM	Edutainment		Fuji Heavy Industries	1996	JP
Katz Pippin Demo CD	Utility Tool	3ème Vague	Katz Media	1997	PAL
Mac Bin 38	Utility Tool			1997	JP
Mac Bin 40A & 40B	Utility Tool			1997	JP
Mobile Suit Gundam: Zion Dukedom Military-File	Interactive encyclopedia; reference	JVC Advanced Media		1997	JP
Movioke	Multimedia Tool	DigiToy Entertainment		1997	NA
NetCruiser	Web Tool	Netcom		1996	JP
New Legacy Laboratory	Edutainment		Fuji Heavy Industries	1996	JP
Ocean Life: Hawaii edition	Edutainment	Universal Magic	Sumeria	1996	JP
PEASE	Application launcher; freeware/shareware compilation	Maki Enterprise	Emotion Digital Software	1996	JP
Pippin Atmark Demonstration Disk	Demonstration software	Apple Inc.		199?	JP
Pippin Atmark ISDN Setup CD	Web Tool	Active Open Communications		199?	JP
Pippin Hardware Demo	Utility Tool			199?	JP
Pippin Navigator CD	Utility Tool			1996	JP
Pippin Network CD	Web Tool	Active Open Communication		1996	JP
PiPPiN Title	Software catalogue; promotional disc	Bandai Digital Entertainment		1996	JP
Post de Card	Art Tool	SystemSoft	Bandai Digital Entertainment	1996	JP
Shichisokusen	Educational reference; history and business	Radio Tanba	Media Five	1996	JP
SurfEZ! masterCD	Web Tool		Katz Media	1997	PAL
Tarot Mystery	Tarot divination; fortune-telling	Visit	Visit	1996	JP
Teleport Jr. CD-ROM Magazine	Utility Tool			1996	JP
The Virgin Of a Legend	Multimedia Tool			1996	JP
TV Works	Productivity suite	Sonoran Blue		1996	NA, JP
WebViewer with MS Internet Explorer	Web Tool	Microsoft		1997	JP
With Open Eyes: Images from the Art Institute of Chicago	Art reference; interactive gallery	Voyager	Voyager	1996	JP
Yellows	Photography collection; interactive photobook	Digitalogue		1996	JP

== Reception ==
In May 1996, PC Graphics Report interviewed a Japanese executive associated with Bandai, concluding that attempting to market a gaming console as a computer was a sign of lack of cultural research on the part of the Japan-based Bandai. In particular, computer-illiterate people did not know what an "@" sign was, as in the name @WORLD. American consumers could not grasp the idea of surfing the Internet using such a device. Executives could not understand how Americans might not be interested in surfing the Internet. Even among Internet surfers, the Pippin was not necessarily the console of choice. A July 1996 article in Electronic Gaming Monthly pointed out that the competing Sega Saturn and its separately sold Netlink device combined still cost under $400, making it a far less expensive Internet appliance than the Pippin. Additionally, any device that was not simple to use would fail in the U.S. market.

The small default memory configuration could not run the industry-standard Netscape 2.0 browser, or anything comparable to Java and VRML support. The rendering of text on the most common composite video TV screen made reading difficult. The $599 (equivalent to $1,200 in 2025) price was too high, especially during late 1996 when the Bandai Pippin was originally released. In May 2006, the Pippin was listed 22nd in PC World's list of the "25 Worst Tech Products of All Time."

== See also ==
- Apple Arcade
- Apple Interactive Television Box
- Apple TV
