= Gundam 0079: The War for Earth =

1997 interactive movie video game

- Developer: Presto Studios
- Publisher: Bandai Digital Entertainment Corporation
- Platforms: Macintosh, Windows, PlayStation, Apple Bandai Pippin
- Release: WW: 1997
- Genres: Interactive film Mecha; Military Science Fiction
- Modes: Single-player, multiplayer

Gundam 0079: The War for Earth is a video game developed by Presto Studios and published by Bandai Digital Entertainment for Macintosh, Windows, PlayStation, and Apple Bandai Pippin.

== Story ==
The story broadly follows the futuristic plot of the Mobile Suit Gundam (1979) series by Yoshiyuki Tomino and Hajime Yatate, where the Duchy of Zeon, which includes several space colonies ruled with an iron fist by the Zabi family, rebels against the Terran Federation; At that time, armies mainly used mobile suits, (literally "mobile armor"): humanoid mechas of several meters built en masse. At first, the hero, a young civilian, finds himself embroiled in a Zeon attack on the neutral colony Side 7. In general panic, he takes control of a prototype mobile suit named Gundam and manages to instinctively pilot it for destroy an enemy and gain space. There, he enlisted in a Federation ship named White Base, under the command of Bright Noa.

The story continues as in the series, with the White Base operating several dangerous missions against Zeon and its elite pilot, Char Aznable, as the player develops newtype (evolved human) talents. Several epic battles allow the Federation to gradually regain the upper hand until the final victory, despite heavy losses, including in the entourage of the player.

Throughout the game, the player therefore adopts the point of view of an unnamed hero which is referred to as "gundam" despite that being the name of the robot mech that is the namesake of the franchise and not the main hero of the original anime (Amuro Ray).

== Gameplay ==
Gundam 0079: The War for Earth is an interactive movie in which the player pilots the Mobile Suit Gundam which offers a first-person view in a 3D environment, the player in the cockpit of his mobile follows. The game is presented in the form of long interactive cutscenes, requiring the use of the keyboard and the mouse. The player is expected to interact and make the right decisions at the right times as the scenario progresses, such as attacking, moving, activating the shield, or making strategic choices. Decision-making usually needs to be done quickly in order to complete the missions and continue the game; however, it is possible to increase the reaction time required.

The interface consists of four elements: the view from the cockpit, two monitors (filming blind spots) and a damage indicator, all appearing at the same time on the game screen.

== Reception ==
Next Generation reviewed the Macintosh version of the game, rating it two stars out of five, and stated that "Gundam 0079 is certainly not for the action gamer, nor for the adventurer. It is an impressive bundle of technologies, but serves best as a new experience for fans of the existing Gundam opus." The game was released in Japan first for The Apple Pippin and Macintosh / PC in late 1996, early 1997, then for PlayStation on May 2, 1997. Among the critics, Keith Rhee appreciates the graphics of the game, while regretting the unnatural integration of real actors or the insufficiently fine-grained capture of movement. Michael Dixon also appreciates the graphics and immersion but notes a sometimes high difficulty due to the various interfaces. Brian Chui finally writes that despite the quality of the animation, this kind of game based on interactive cutscenes offers rather poor gameplay. He also criticizes the acting.

== Development ==
Bandai, owner of the Gundam franchise, entrusted the production of Gundam 0079: The War for Earth to an American studio, Presto Studios, known for its first-person adventure games. If the previous Gundam games are more oriented towards strategy, the idea of simulating the piloting of a mobile suit is already found in Gundam on PlayStation in 1995. Here, Bandai and Presto Studios decided to adopt a more cinematic approach, using CGI animation and having real actors play the characters for the game's many FMVs. Although the story resumes that of the original Mobile Suit Gundam series, the graphics are rather inspired by Mobile Suit Gundam 0083, released in 1991. From the start, a collaboration was set up with Sunrise (director of anime) to respect the universe of the series, a common practice in Japanese animation.

The actual design was done iteratively. She started with the 3D modeling of environments, robots and characters under the responsibility of Victor Navone, Frank Vitale and Derek Becker with Alias 3D and QuickTime VR. Then the animation of these objects (which used motion capture systems) and the graphic effects are carried out by the teams of Shadi Almassizadeh and Eric Fernandes on Silicon Graphics machines. The final arrangement of the game and function of the scenario is ultimately the responsibility of Tim Tembruell. At the same time, composer Jamey Scott wrote the musical score. In the end, two years of work were needed to design the product.
