= Apple speakers =

Music and multimedia speakers by Apple

Apple Inc. has produced and sold numerous music and multimedia speakers, either available for standalone purchase or bundled with Macintosh products.

== Plug-and-play speakers ==
=== Bose RoomMate speakers ===
Apple-branded Bose RoomMate speakers

In September 1986, Apple sold a special edition of the Bose RoomMate speakers for the Apple IIGS computer—which sports a built-in Ensoniq synthesizer chip with optional stereo output. The front grille of each speaker had the Bose logo inside a black rectangle, and dealer-only releases had the official rainbow Apple logo in a square next to it. The speakers matched the platinum gray color scheme introduced with the IIGS that year. Publicly sold editions of the speakers, likely for legal issues pertaining to Apple Records, replaced the Apple-shaped logo with a rainbow-colored square, and eventually removed any Apple reference entirely. The powered speakers lacked a variable volume knob or magnetic shielding (a warning label stated to keep it distanced from the CRT and magnetic storage) and retailed for US$229.99 (equivalent to $680 in 2025). Although primarily intended for the Apple IIGS which it cosmetically matched and better suited for its advanced audio capabilities, the speakers were also made available for early Macintosh models.

=== AppleDesign Powered Speakers ===
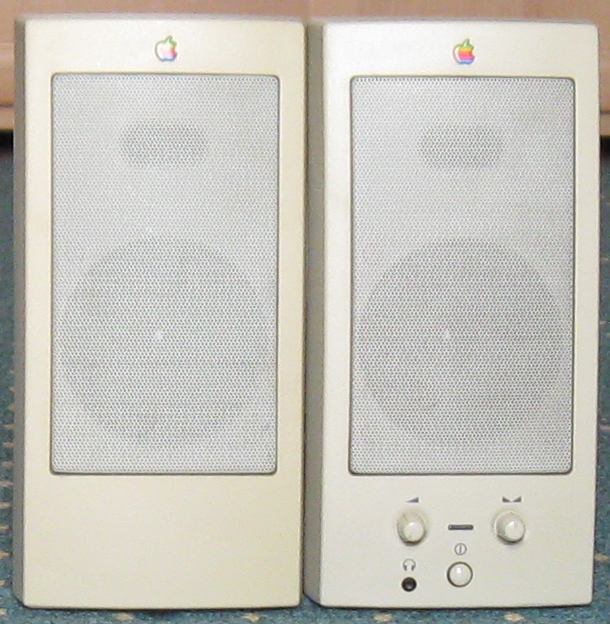
AppleDesign Powered Speakers (M6082)

Along with the PowerCD introduced in 1993, Apple released two versions of their desktop speakers: the AppleDesign Powered Speakers (M6082) and the redesigned AppleDesign Powered Speakers II (M2497) a year later. The original speakers came in platinum gray to match Apple's desktop line, while the second generation were smaller, curvier and came in both platinum gray and a darker granite gray color designed to match the PowerBook line and PowerCD. Both were powered with an AC adapter and could be attached to any audio output source, with two separate inputs for the computer and an external CD player. Both had a headphone jack in the front of one speaker along with the volume control and an optional subwoofer connection port on some models.

=== G4 Cube speakers ===
Apple bundled a pair of model M7963 clear spherical/globe Sound Stick 2.1 based speakers with the Power Mac G4 Cube, which was released on July 19, 2000. They used a custom USB interface and originally worked with the G4 Cube, Power PCs and ADC/ADP monitor screens. They work right up to OSX 10.6.4 Snow Leopard. They were designed by Jonathan Ive & created in partnership with Harman Kardon, and were enlarged versions of the Odyssey speakers built in to the iMac G3.

=== Apple Pro Speakers ===
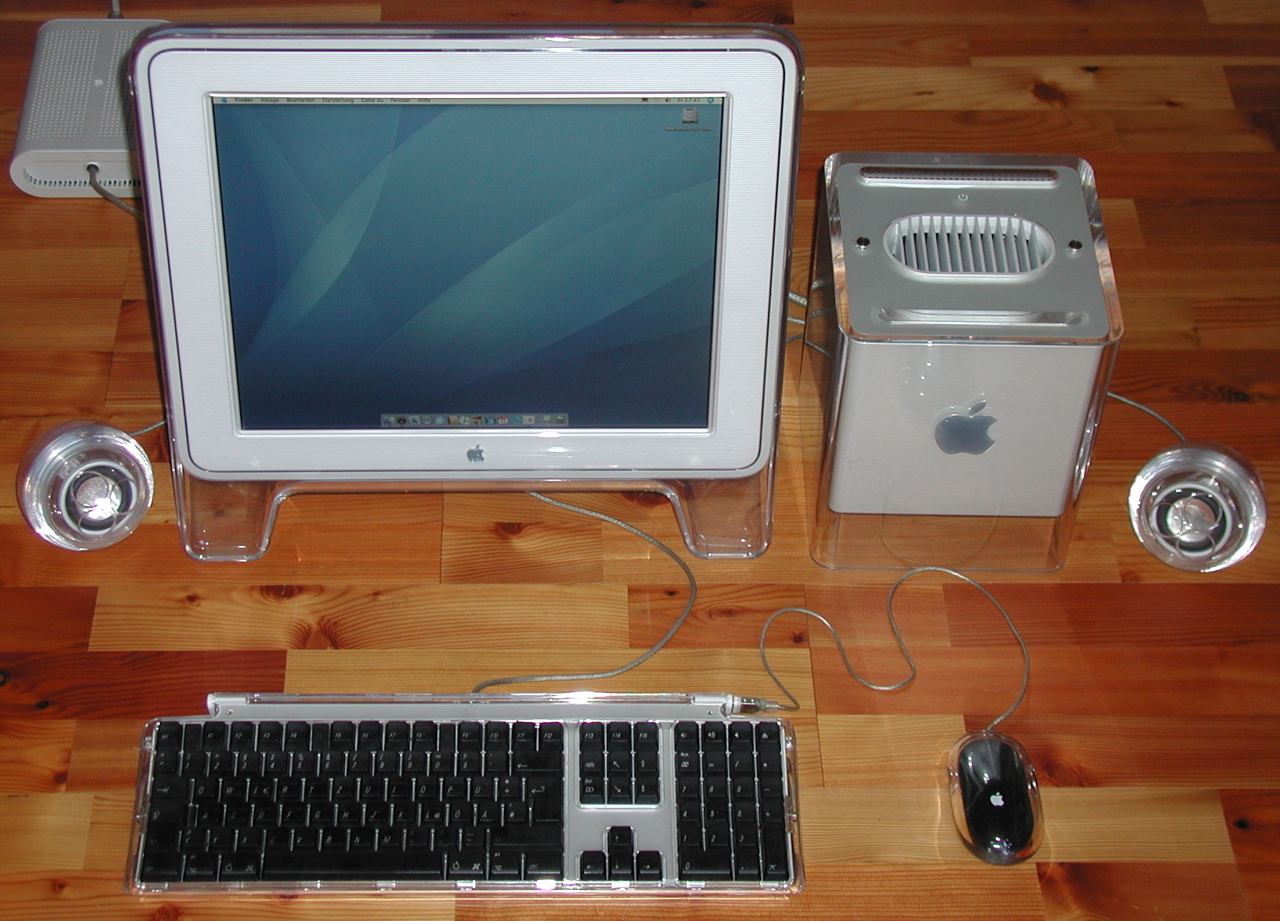
Apple Pro Speakers paired with a Power Mac G4 Cube

The Apple Pro Speakers were introduced in January 2001 alongside the Power Mac G4 Digital Audio, based on the G4 Cube's spherical speakers with a new digital audio system, plastic grilles, white rubber/silicone surrounds rather than the black foam used on the G4 cube speakers and changed the connector to a proprietary minijack that provided both power and audio. They were available as a standalone purchase for $59 and bundled with some versions of the iMac G4.

=== Harman Kardon SoundSticks and iSub ===
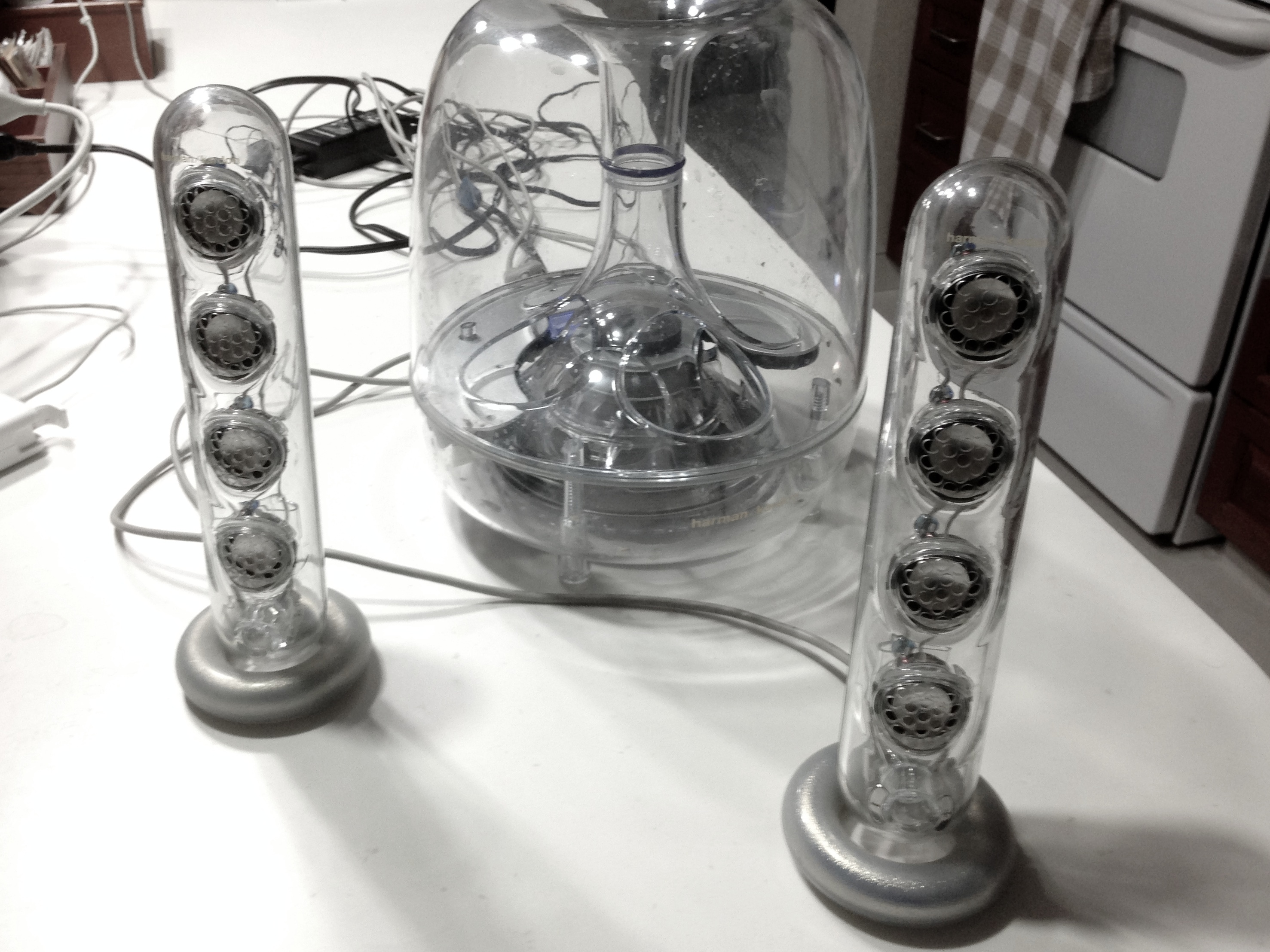
Harman Kardon Soundsticks and iSub

Apple announced the iSub in 1999, a 6-inch subwoofer produced in partnership with Harman Kardon, designed by Jony Ive. It uses clear plastic to match the aesthetic of the iMac G3. It connected over USB.

Next, Harman Kardon and Apple designed the SoundSticks, which were introduced at the 2000 Macworld expo. Apple led the industrial design and mechanical engineering to have them fit into its product family. They include a new revision of the iSub. They won an Industrial Design Excellence Awards gold award and were featured on the cover of I.D. magazine. SoundSticks II were a minor upgrade, adding capacitive volume control buttons and a 3.5mm mini-jack input, replacing the previous USB input. SoundSticks III changed the styling slightly using black highlights and white lighting, instead of green and blue of the original SoundSticks and the SoundSticks II. SoundSticks Wireless introduced Bluetooth.

=== iPod Hi-Fi ===
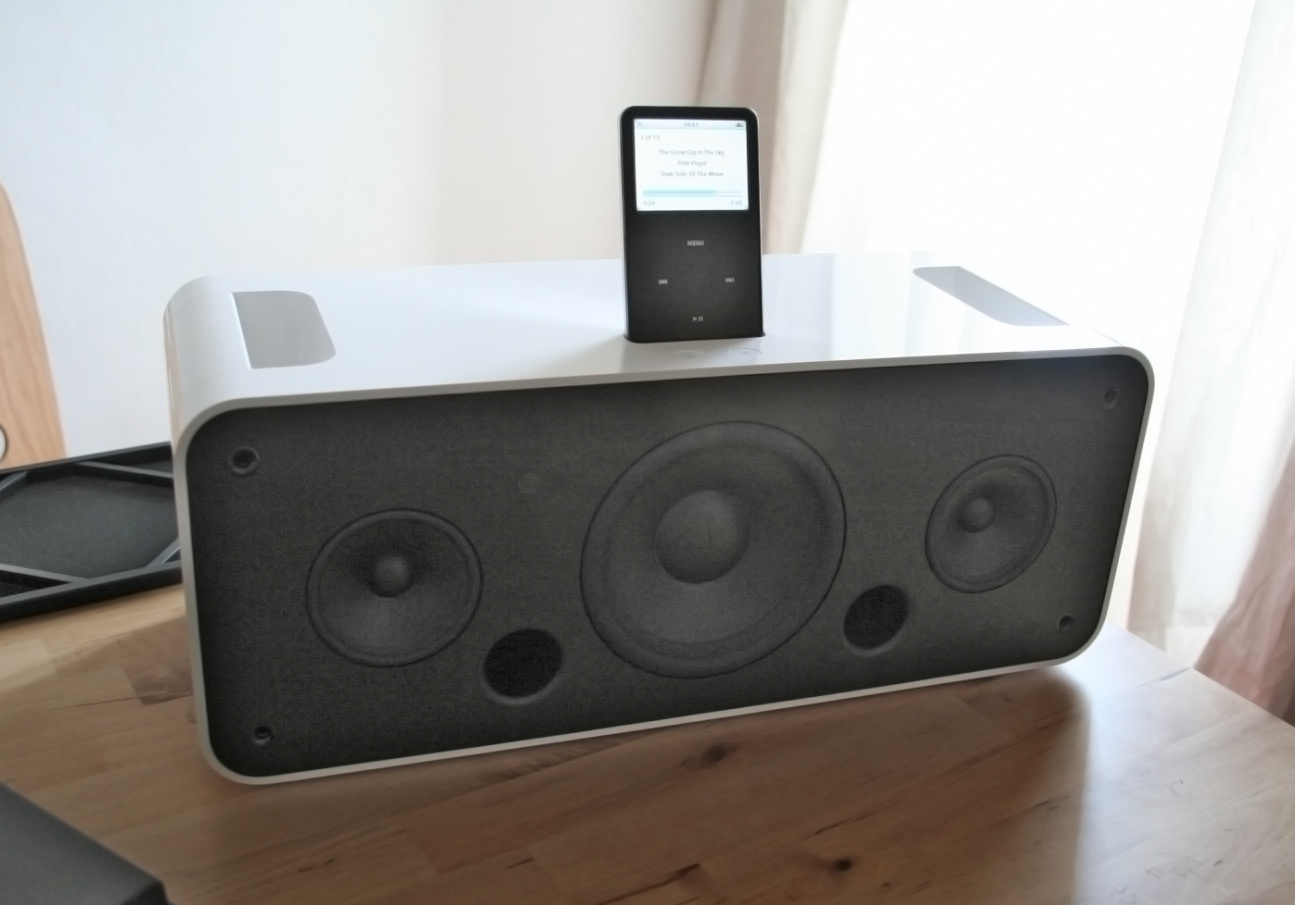
iPod Hi-Fi

iPod Hi-Fi is a speaker system that was released on February 28, 2006, for use with any iPod digital music player. The iPod Hi-Fi retailed at the Apple Store for US$349 until its discontinuation on September 5, 2007.

The iPod Hi-Fi was praised for its big rich sound, bass response, ease of use, remote performance, and battery options, though it received criticism for its high price, lack of an AM/FM radio, and the limited functionality of its remote control.

== Smart speakers ==
=== HomePod ===
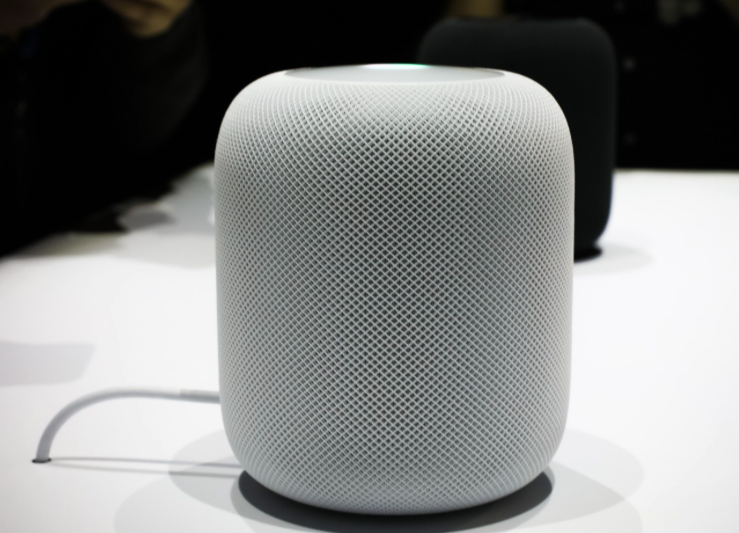
HomePod

The first-generation HomePod smart speaker was released on February 9, 2018. It was sold in two colors: white and space gray. It had a small touchscreen on its top, seven tweeters in its base, and a four-inch woofer towards the top, as well as six microphones used for voice control and acoustic optimization; it also supports beamforming. It runs the audioOS operating system, which is based on iOS. The HomePod can act as a speaker and as a Siri voice assistant that listens for the "Hey Siri" command. The first-generation HomePod was discontinued on March 13, 2021. The second-generation was introduced on January 18, 2023.

=== HomePod Mini ===
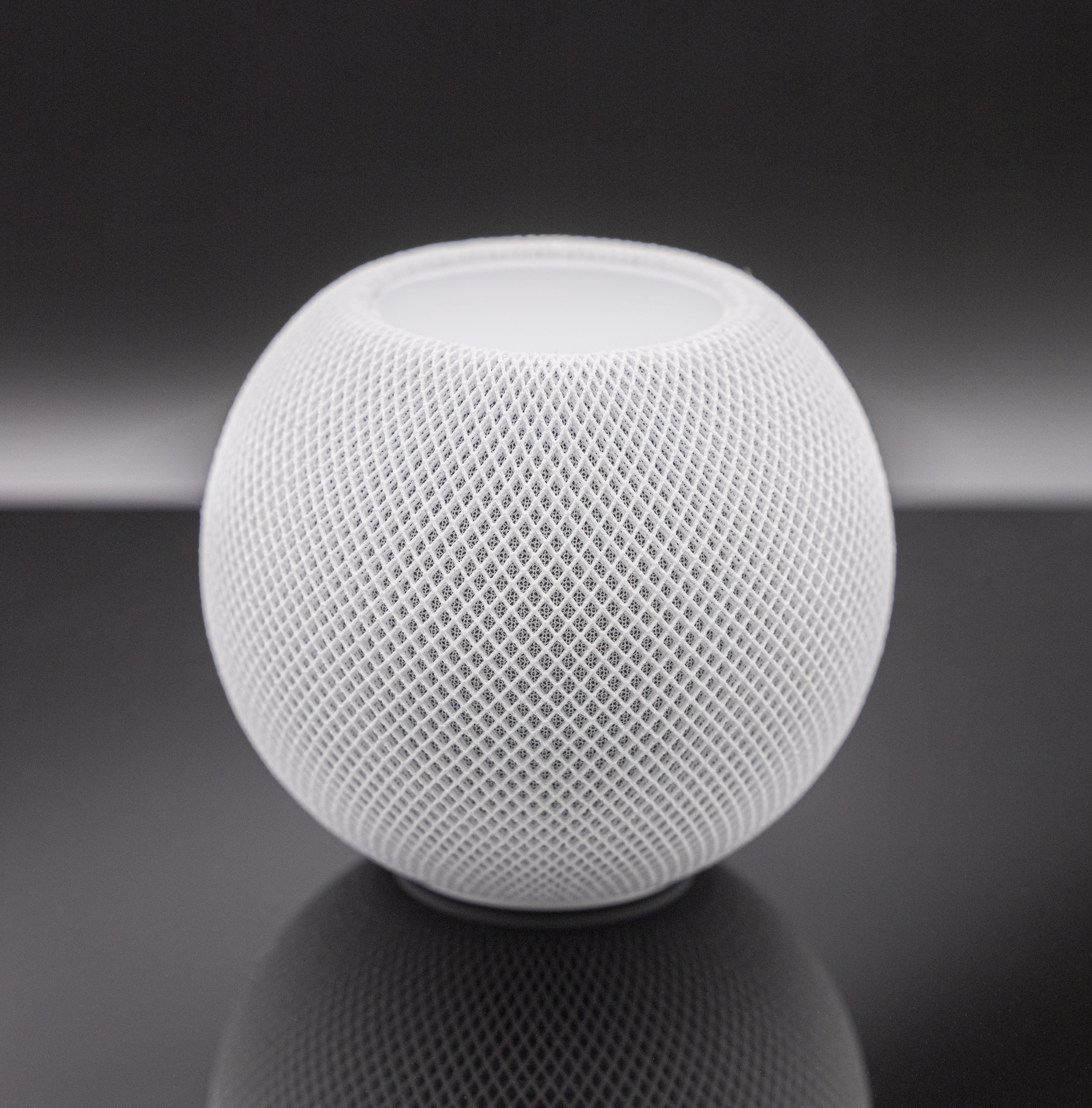
HomePod Mini

The HomePod Mini (stylized HomePod mini) was released on November 16, 2020. It is smaller than the HomePod, roughly spherical, and has three speakers and four microphones. Intercom, a new feature on HomePod and HomePod Mini introduced in iOS 14.1 and iPadOS 14.1, allows iPhone, iPad, and Apple Watch users with multiple HomePods and HomePod Minis to communicate between rooms using their voice. Siri recognizes up to six voices, and personalizes responses for each one.

=== HomeView ===
The HomeView is part of the Apple Home family, and was announced on October 13, 2026. It is Apple's first smart speaker to feature a graphical user interface. The device acts as a smart display, as well as a home hub to control Apple Home accessories. The HomeView's software features a limited selection of apps and voice control with Siri AI.

== See also ==
- Timeline of Apple Inc. products
- AirPods
- Apple headphones
