= Mr. Potato Head Saves Veggie Valley =

1995 video game

- Developers: Duck Soup Productions Inc. Turning Point Software
- Publisher: Hasbro Electronic Entertainment
- Platforms: Microsoft Windows, Macintosh, Apple Pippin
- Release: November 13, 1995
- Genres: Adventure, puzzle
- Mode: Single-player

Mr. Potato Head Saves Veggie Valley is a PC CD-ROM game. It focuses on Mr. Potato Head and his daughter, Sweet Potato working together to save Veggie Valley from a drought. It was later released as part of Mac Kids Pack.

== Gameplay ==
The game is a point-and-click adventure. It features collectable items, which are kept in Sweet Potato's backpack. Another feature is a wardrobe, which the player can use to dress up Mr. Potato Head and, or Sweet Potato for a disguise when necessary. A separate game mode allows the player to play the game's minigames without playing the full game.

== Plot ==
The story begins at Mr. Potato Head's house, where he, his wife, Mrs. Potato Head, and their daughter, Sweet Potato are saddened over not getting any rain as the local rain cloud has been hanging over the country fair instead of their town, Veggie Valley. Sweet Potato suggests that they go to the fair to bring the cloud back to Veggie Valley, which Mr. Potato Head agrees to. At the fair, Mr. Potato Head and Sweet Potato discover an airplane ride; the ride's owner agrees to loan the ride to them if they complete four tasks for him.

After completing all four tasks, Mr. Potato Head and Sweet Potato are able to pull the cloud over to the plane ride and fly all the way home. The denizens of Veggie Valley then stack themselves up high in order to talk to the cloud and convince him to rain; the cloud refuses to do so until Sweet Potato dresses up in a silly costume, causing the cloud to laugh and rain on the Potato family's garden, which ends Veggie Valley's drought.
