= Apple QuickTake =

Digital camera by Apple Computer (1994–1997)

QuickTake
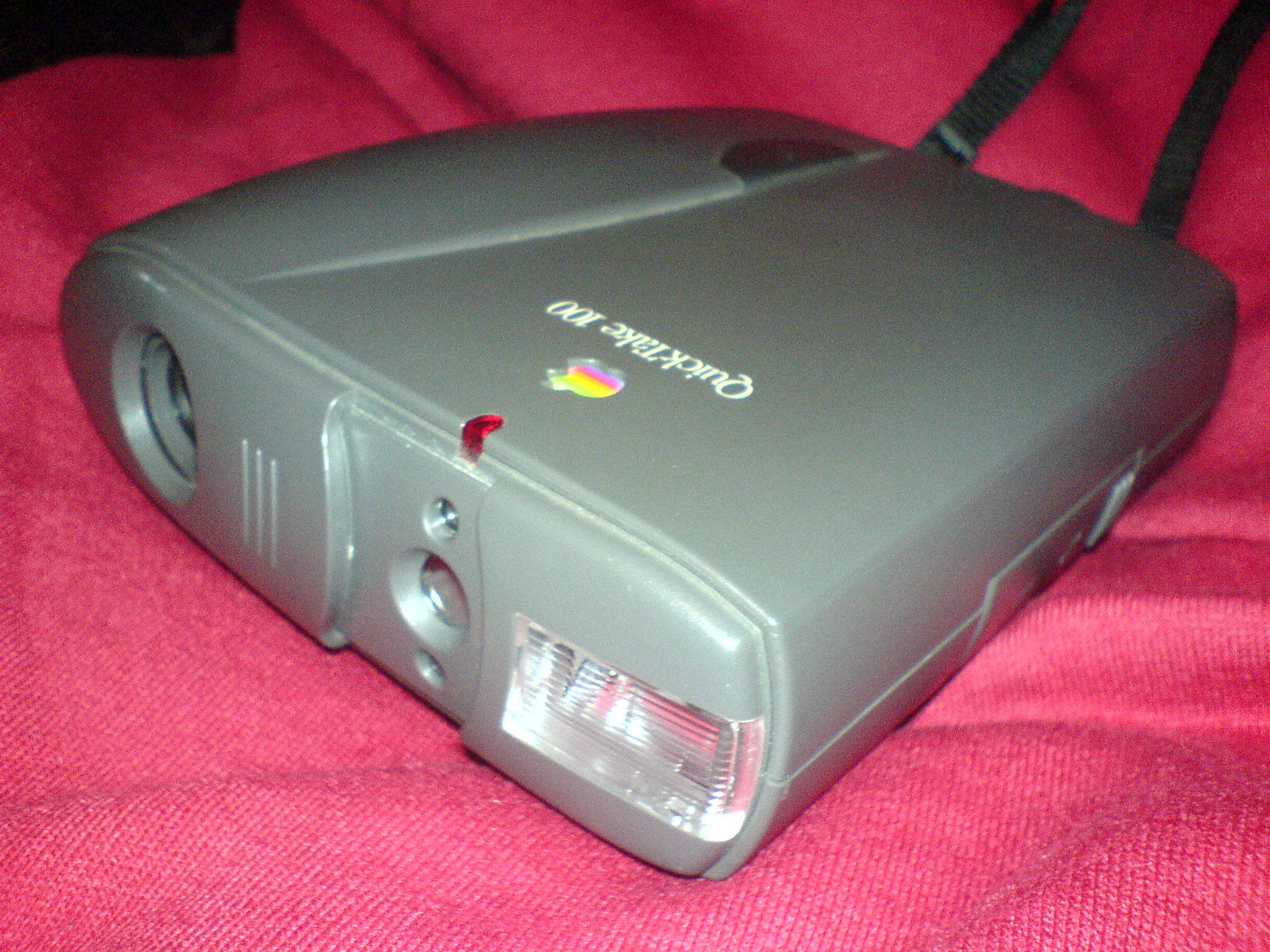
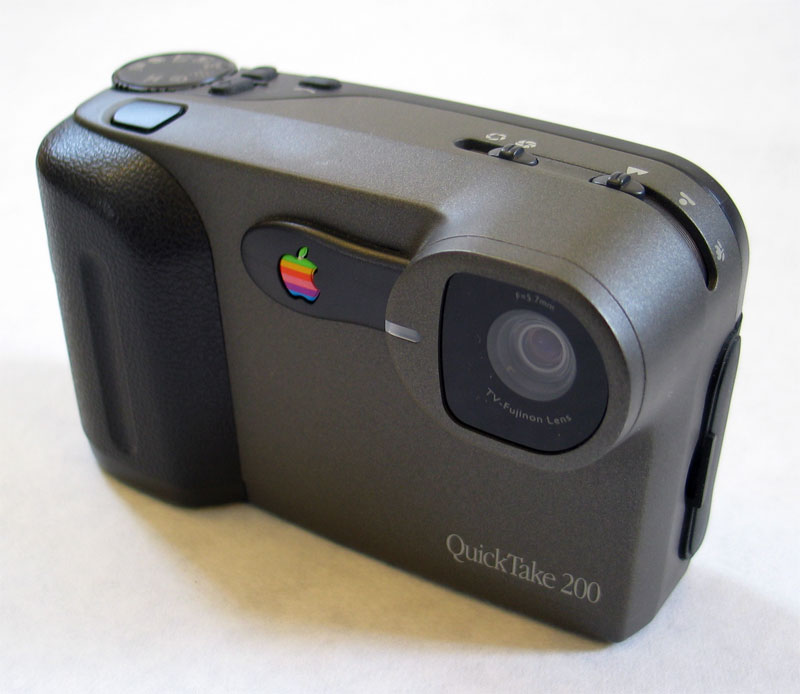
- Top: QuickTake 100 (150 similar in appearance); Bottom: QuickTake 200

Overview
- Maker: Apple Computer (branding); Chinon and Fujifilm (OEM)
- Type: point-and-shoot digital
- Production: 1994–97

Sensor/medium
- Maximum resolution: 640×480

The Apple QuickTake (codenamed Venus, Mars, Neptune) is one of the first consumer digital camera lines. It was launched in 1994 by Apple Computer and was marketed for three years before being discontinued in 1997. Three models of the product were built, including the 100 and 150, both designed by Kodak and built by Kodak's manufacturing partner Chinon, and the 200, built by Fujifilm. The QuickTake cameras had a resolution of 640 x 480 pixels maximum (0.3 Mpx).

Time magazine profiled QuickTake as "the first consumer digital camera" and ranked it among its "100 greatest and most influential gadgets from 1923 to the present" list. Although the greyscale Dycam Model 1 (also marketed as the Logitech FotoMan) was the first consumer digital camera to be sold in the US (starting in November 1990) and at least one other camera, the Fuji DS-X, was sold in Japan even earlier, in late 1989, the QuickTake was the first digicam to have wide consumer acceptance.

The QuickTake was part of Apple's efforts during the 1990s to branch out beyond computers into consumer electronics. Other products from this period included the PowerCD, Pippin game console and the Apple Interactive Television Box, and Newton personal digital assistants. None achieved widespread commercial success.

== History ==
Kodak began developing CCD-based digital cameras in 1972, when Dr. Roger Van Heyningen, the Director of the Physics Division at Kodak Research Labs established a laboratory to develop CCD image sensors. In 1974, Peter Dillon and his colleagues invented single-chip color image sensors and developed a single-sensor color video camera. In December 1975, Steve Sasson and his colleagues at the Kodak Apparatus Division built a toaster-sized experimental model of a digital camera using a 100 x 100 pixel Fairchild CCD image sensor that recorded digital image data to a cassette tape. However, the first electronic still cameras to be marketed were shown as early as 1981, when Sony demonstrated the prototype Pro Mavica. These early filmless cameras recorded analog still video frames instead of creating digital files; the Pro Mavica recorded its still frames on a proprietary floppy disk. By the late 1980s, the technologies were beginning to converge and mature; Fujifilm showed the DS-1P, a still video camera that stored its images in solid-state memory instead of a floppy, at Photokina 1988 and developed the technologies into the Fuji DS-X, which was first sold in 1989. Kodak introduced a prototype of its DCS 100, a digital SLR based on the Nikon F3 in 1986 and began commercial sales to news photographers in 1991; the DCS 100 used a CCD sensor and stored its images on a tethered hard drive.

The Dycam Model 1 was launched in 1991, capturing greyscale images into internal memory; CNN noted the Dycam's possibilities in a 1992 segment, touting its advantages over conventional film-based cameras. In 1992, Apple Computer started marketing plans for a digital camera codenamed Venus. At the time, over $12 billion was spent annually in the United States on photography. Apple sought a company to design and manufacture its QuickTake digital camera line. During this time, Apple entered into a set of non-disclosure agreements with Kodak to share its proprietary digital camera architecture and cooperate in its further development; Kodak contributed the CCD sensor to the final design. Later, Chinon was added as the manufacturing/assembly partner, also responsible for the design of the optics and basic electronics. By October 1993, rumors of Venus and its capabilities had publicly tied Kodak, Apple, and Chinon together; the cost was anticipated to be relatively low compared to existing digital cameras.

=== QuickTake 100 ===
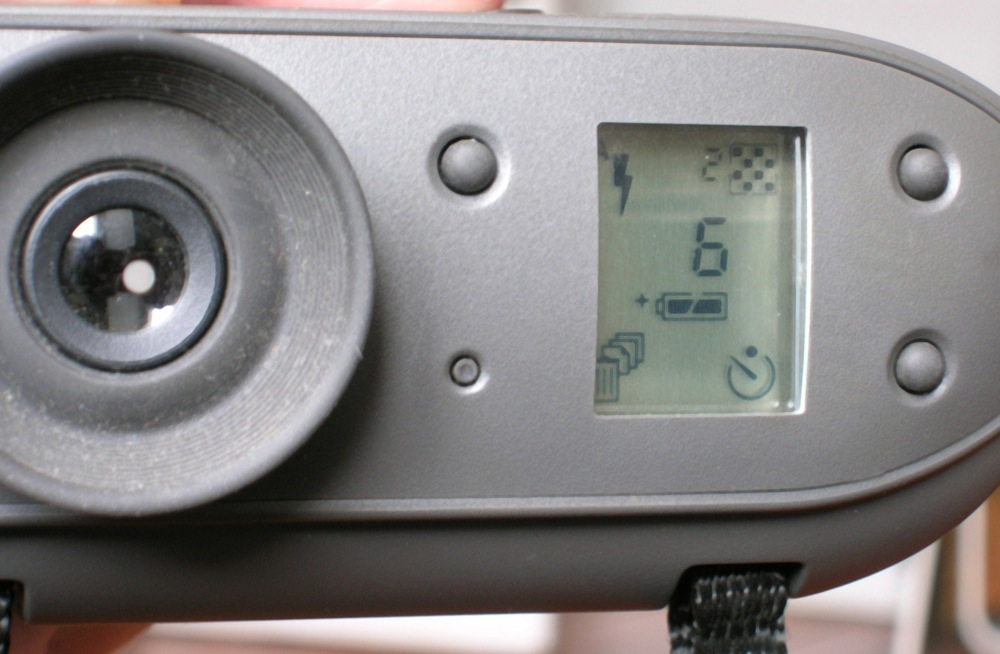
Viewfinder and LCD information panel on the rear side of the QuickTake 100/150; clockwise from top left, the buttons control flash mode, resolution, self-timer, and internal memory (recessed to prevent accidental deletion).

The QuickTake 100 was first shown at Tokyo MacWorld on February 17, 1994, exhibited for the first time in America at the Photo Marketing Association trade show, and released for sale on June 20 of that year. The initial list price was US$749 (equivalent to $1,630 in 2025). It was one of the first digital cameras marketed to consumers, emphasizing ease of use. It received a Product Design Award in 1995, and early reviews were enthusiastic about the industrial design and ease of use. Two separate models (for Macintosh or Windows) were sold; the bundled software and serial cable were specific to the host computer's operating system, but the camera hardware itself was identical. The Windows version of the QuickTake 100 was released by December 1994. The CCD sensor was manufactured by Kodak and was also used in the Kodak DC 40 camera. It was a full frame image sensor with 9 micron square pixels and Bayer pattern color filter.

The camera had a built-in flash, but no focus or zoom controls, as the fixed-focal length lens had an equivalent angle of view as a standard 50mm lens for a 35mm film camera; the fixed-focus lens captured a range from 4 feet (1.2 m) to infinity; autoexposure was set by the camera, which controlled both shutter speeds (ranging from 1/30 to 1/175) and aperture (from f/2.8 to f/16) using a film speed equivalent to ISO 85. The flash has a maximum range of 9 feet (2.7 m).

The QuickTake 100 was capable of storing eight photos at 640×480 resolution, 32 photos at 320×240 resolution, or a mixture of both sizes. All photos were stored at 24-bit color. There was no way to preview them on the camera, nor was there any way to delete individual photos from the camera (though there was a recessed 'trash' button which would delete the entire contents of the camera). The bundled Apple QuickTake software was used to retrieve photographs from the camera's internal memory, providing basic editing tools (rotating, resizing, and cropping) and allowing the user to select a file format and color bit depth for export.

==== Quicktake 100 Plus ====
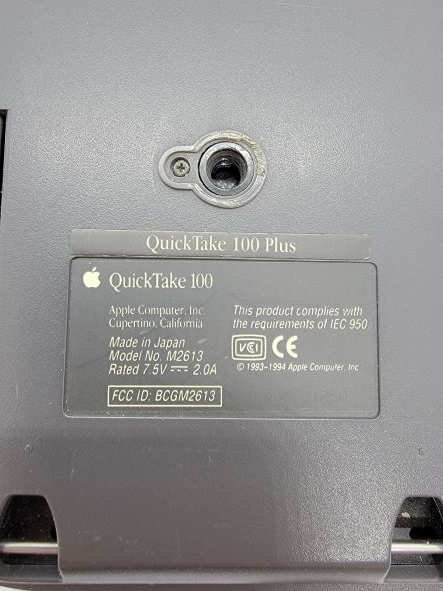
Apple Quicktake 100 Plus Label

Apple offered a factory upgrade to the QuickTake 100 changing the name to the QuickTake 100 Plus, which included all the functionality of the QuickTake 150.

=== QuickTake 150 ===
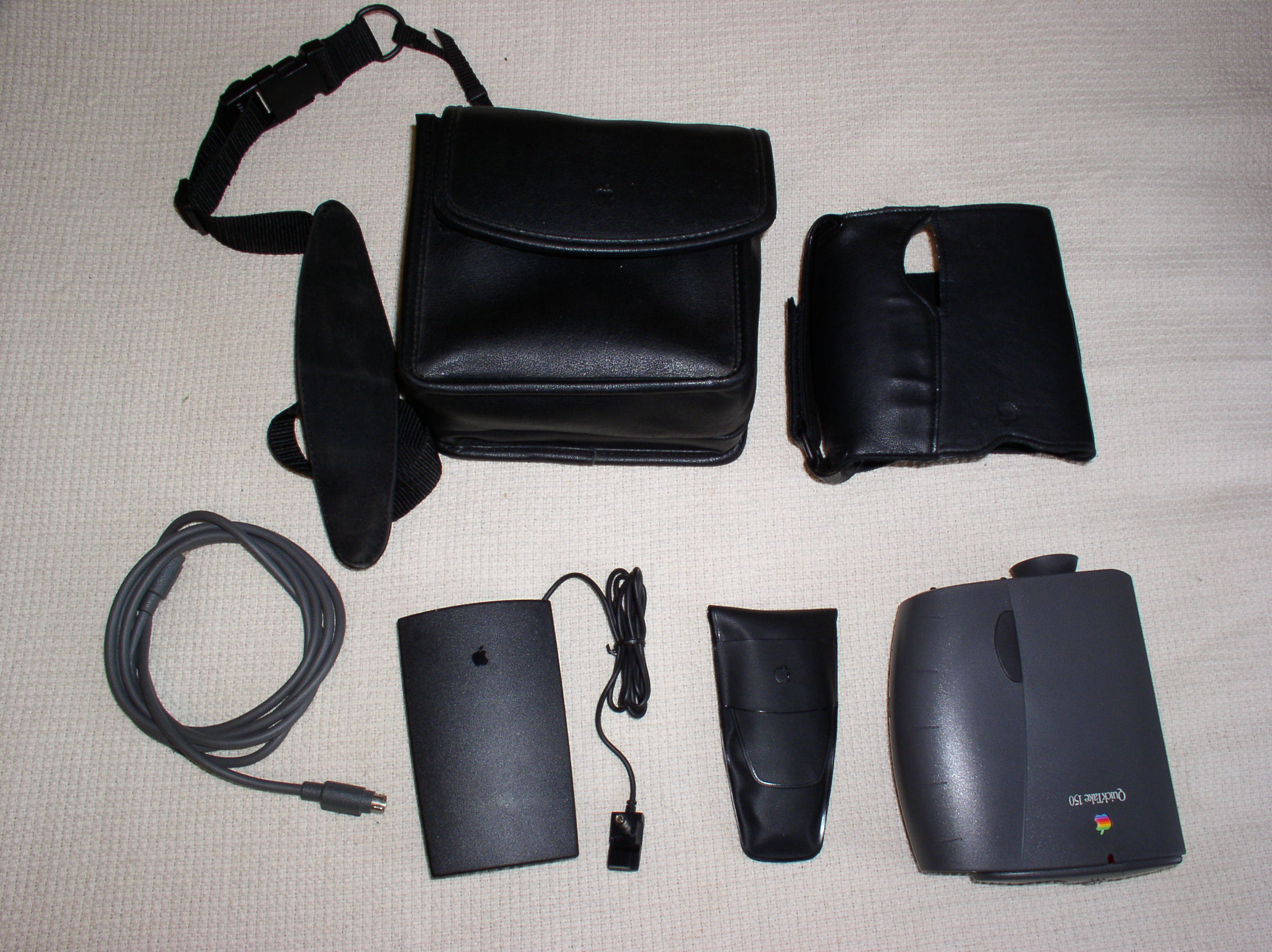
QuickTake 150 kit with case, cable, booster pack, and close-up lens accessories

Apple improved the file compression technology and released the QuickTake 150 in April 1995, replacing the 100. The 150 uses the same hardware as the 100, and the improved compression enabled the QuickTake 150 to capture 16 best-quality or 32 standard-quality images, with either quality level now stored at the full resolution of 640×480 in the 1MB of built-in storage.

At the same time, Kodak introduced its DC40, which used a similar design and hardware as the QuickTake 150, but captured images at an increased resolution to a larger internal storage. The QuickTake 150 sensor was the same as used in the DC40, but masked to a lower resolution; the DC40 used the entire sensor instead.

The QuickTake 150 kit also included PhotoFlash software (for Macintosh) or PhotoNow! (for Windows) and a separate close-up lens that changed the focus range to 10 to 14 inches (25 to 36 cm) and diffused the flash appropriately. Apple also offered several different accessories for the QuickTake 150, including a travel case, AC adapter, battery booster pack (using 8×AA batteries), and a connection kit for Microsoft Windows.

=== QuickTake 200 ===
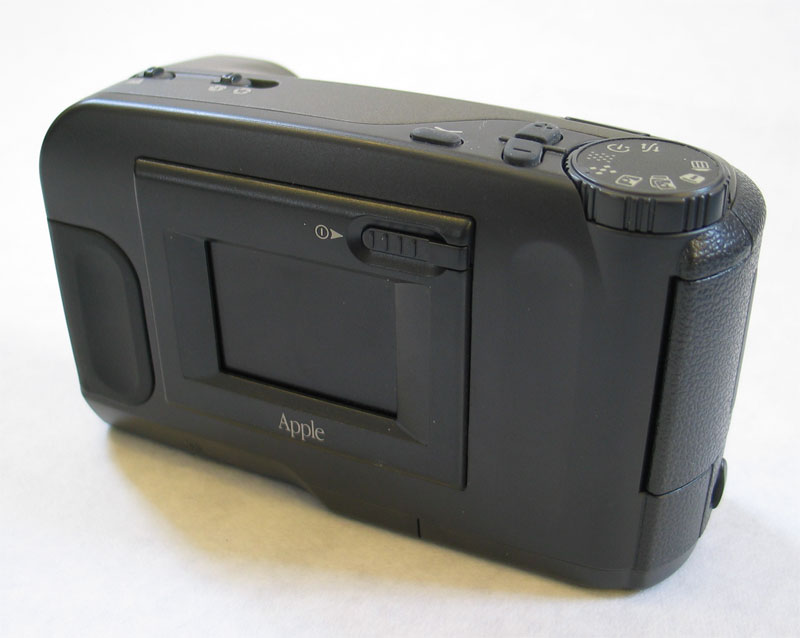
Back of a QuickTake 200

The last QuickTake model was the Fujifilm-built QuickTake 200, released in 1996. The QuickTake 200 was a still video camera that captured images at 640×480 resolution. It was bundled with a 2MB SmartMedia flashRAM card (SSFDC), and an Apple-branded 4MB card was available as a separate accessory purchase; using the 2MB card, up to 20 (high-quality) or 40 (standard-quality) images could be captured.

Compared to the prior Kodak/Chinon-based models, the most noticeable change for the QuickTake 200 was a 1.8 in (46 mm) color LCD screen on the rear panel, which enabled the preview of stored photographs. The screen updated with a refresh rate of 30 Hz. In addition, the 200 added focus and aperture controls; apertures were now user-selectable, and although the lens was still a fixed-focus lens, three separate focus modes could be selected: close-up, 3.5 to 5 in (8.9 to 12.7 cm); portrait, 17 to 35 in (43 to 89 cm); and standard, 3 ft (0.91 m) to infinity.

=== Discontinuation and legacy ===
Although the QuickTake models sold well in the education and small business markets, other companies such as Kodak, Fujifilm, Canon, and Nikon shortly thereafter entered the digital market with brands that consumers associated with photography. The QuickTake line was discontinued in 1997 shortly after Steve Jobs came back to Apple. In an attempt to streamline Apple's operations, Jobs discontinued many non-computer products, including the Newton line of products, the LaserWriter printer line, and the QuickTake cameras. The Apple QuickTake camera has since become a collector's item for Apple enthusiasts.

Apple later reused the QuickTake name in iPhones released since 2018 as a feature in its camera app, allowing videos to be recorded without switching out of still camera mode.

== Specifications ==
Model		100	150	200
Image				
Image file	Color depth	24-bit		
Image file	Resolution	640 × 480 pixels		
Image file	Format	QuickTake, PICT	QuickTake, BMP, JPEG, PCX, TIFF (Note: The QuickTake 150 can only save to the QuickTake file format on the camera. When connected to a computer, however, files from the QuickTake camera can be converted to BMP, JPEG, PCX, and TIFF.)	
Optics	Focal length	8 mm		5.7 mm
Optics	35 mm equivalent	50 mm		38 mm
Optics	Aperture	f/2.8 to f/16		f/2.2 to f/8 (user-selectable)
Camera features	Viewfinder	Optical with brightlines		LCD; optional clip-on optical included
Camera features	Shutter speed	1/30 to 1/175 second		1/4 to 1/5000 second
Camera features	Storage	1 MB Flash EPROM		2 or 4 MB 5 V SmartMedia card
Camera features	Connection	GeoPort, RS-232C	GeoPort, RS-422, RS-232C	RS-232C, NTSC Video I/O
Camera features	Battery	3 × AA		4 × AA
Marketing	Introduced	February 16, 1994	May 1995	February 17, 1997
Marketing	Discontinued	?		1997
Marketing	Introductory price	US$749 (equivalent to $1,630 in 2025)	US$700 (equivalent to $1,480 in 2025)	US$600 (equivalent to $1,200 in 2025)

== Using QuickTake ==
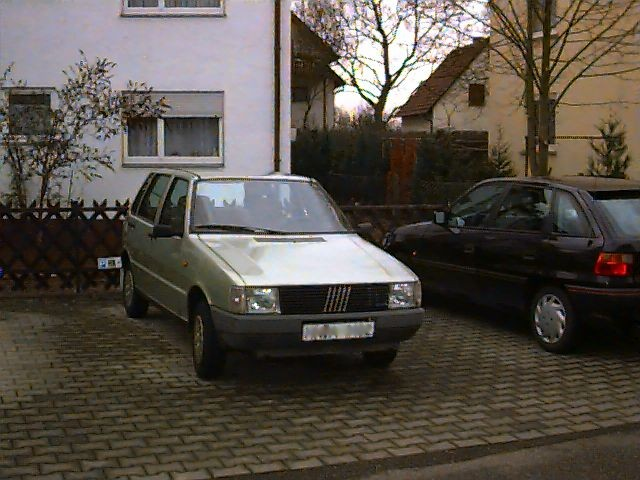
Image taken with the QuickTake 150

The QuickTake 200 can be used with card readers that can read 5V media cards. For users with an Apple Macintosh running System 7 up to Mac OS 9 with a serial port, the QuickTake 200 can be plugged directly into the computer using the Apple QuickTake camera software. The QuickTake 100 and 150 store images internally, not on cards, so they must be used with an Apple serial cable and the QuickTake driver software.

The 200 model is only officially compatible with the Apple Macintosh for direct connections, while the 100 and 150 model are compatible with both the Apple Macintosh and Microsoft Windows. Because the QuickTake 200 is almost identical to the Fuji DS-7 or to Samsung's Kenox SSC-350N, Fuji's software for that camera can be used to gain Windows compatibility for the QuickTake 200. Other software replacements also exist, as well as using an external reader for the removable media of the QuickTake 200.

QuickTake cameras can still be directly connected to modern computers using a USB/serial adapter and the open-source programs GPhoto or JQuickTake (100 and 150 models only). Image files in the QTK format can still be decoded on modern operating systems using the open source programs dcraw, Gphoto or the OS X application GraphicConverter. Quicktake cameras can also be used with Apple II computers.
