= Apple Interactive Television Box =

Digital media appliance

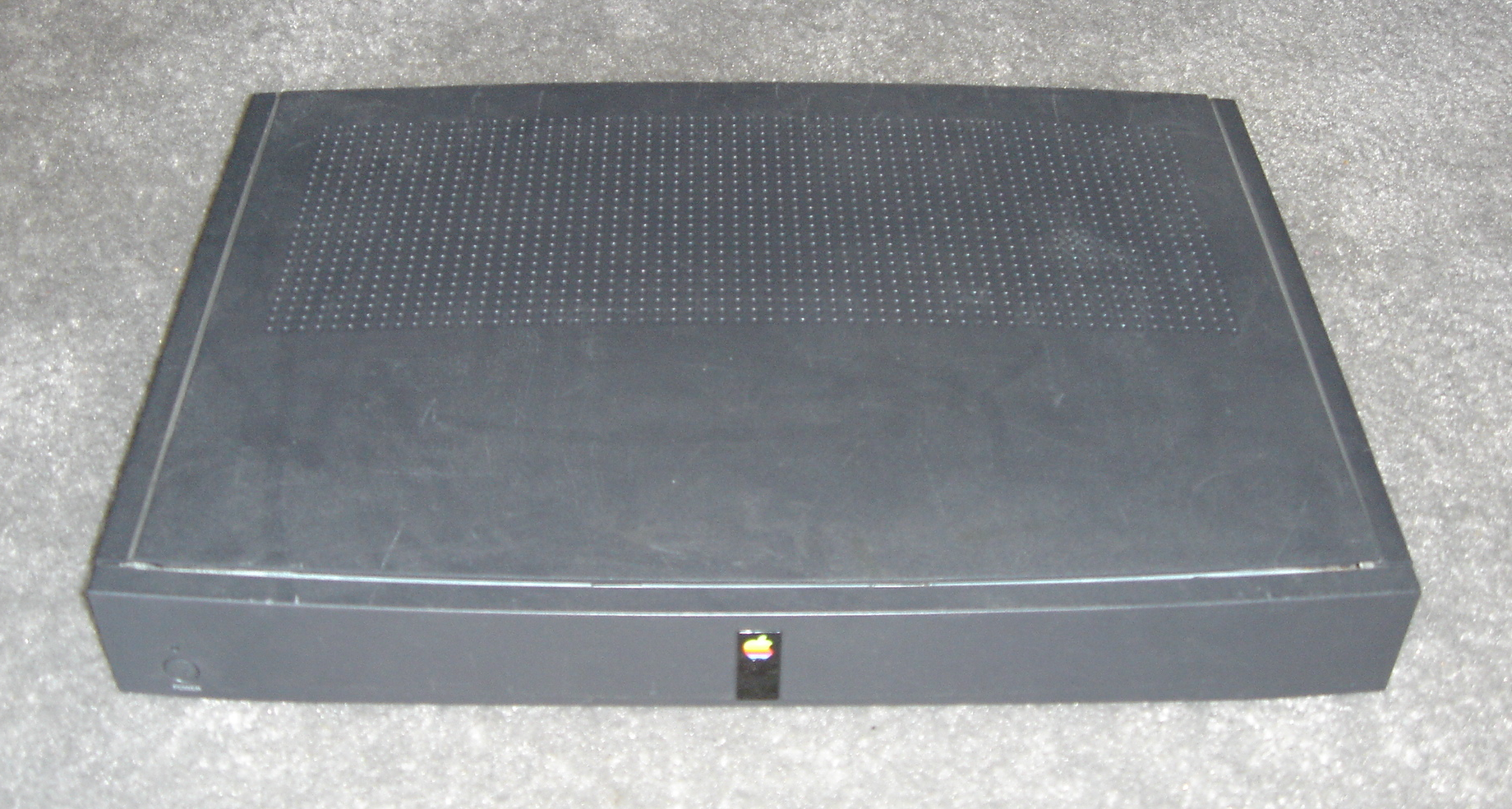
- Prototype
- Developer: Apple Inc.
- Product family: Macintosh Quadra 605 or LC 475
- Type: Set top box prototype
- Lifespan: Early 1990s
- Discontinued: 1995
- Operating system: System 7.1
- Storage: ROM
- Input: Remote control
- Platform: Macintosh
- Marketing target: Consumer, enterprise, and hospitality
- Predecessor: Macintosh TV
- Successor: Pippin; Apple TV

The Apple Interactive Television Box (AITB) is a discontinued prototype of a television set-top box developed by Apple Computer (now Apple Inc.) in partnership with several global telecommunications firms, including British Telecom and Belgacom. Prototypes were deployed at large test markets in parts of the United States and Europe in 1994 and 1995, but the product was canceled shortly thereafter, and was never mass-produced or marketed.

The AITB was part of Apple's efforts during the 1990s to branch out beyond computers into consumer electronics. Other products from this period included the QuickTake digital cameras, PowerCD, Pippin game console, and Newton personal digital assistants. None achieved widespread commercial success.

== Overview ==
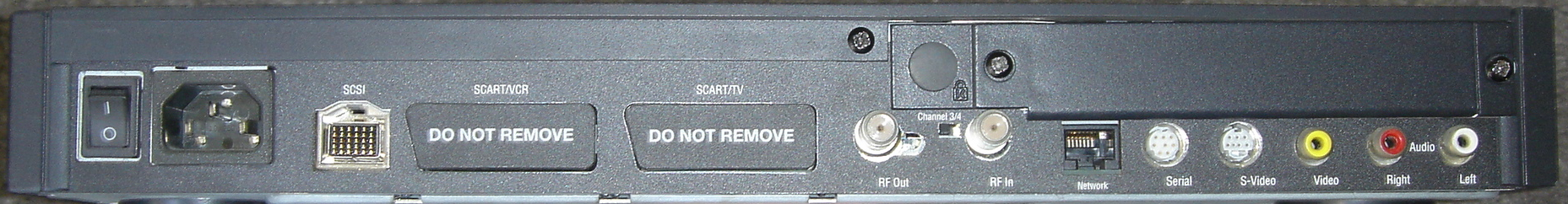
Rear of the unit

The AITB was designed as an interface between a consumer and an interactive television service. Its remote control allows a user to choose what content would be shown on a connected television, and to seek with fast forward and rewind. In this regard, it is functionally similar to a satellite receiver or digital video recorder. The box only passes along the user's choices to a central content server for streaming instead of issuing content itself. There were also plans for game shows, educational material for children, and other forms of content made possible by the interactive qualities of the device.

Early conceptual prototypes have an unfinished feel. Near-completion units have a high production quality, the internal components often lack prototype indicators, and some units have FCC approval stickers. A full manual was released online.

=== Infrastructure ===
Because the machine was designed to be part of a subscription data service which was discontinued, the AITB units became mostly inoperable. The ROM contains only what is required to continue booting from an external hard drive or from its network connection. The ROM contains parts of a downsized System 7.1, enabling it to establish a network connection to the media servers provided by Oracle. The Oracle Media Server (OMS) initially ran on hardware produced by Larry Ellison's nCube Systems company, but was later also made available by Oracle on SGI, Alpha, Sun, SCO, Netware, Windows NT, and AIX systems. These servers also provided the parts of the OS not implemented in ROM of the AITB via the OMS Boot Service. Therefore, an AITB must establish a network connection successfully to finish the boot process. Using a command key combination and a PowerBook SCSI adapter, it is possible to get the AITB to boot into a preinstalled System 7.1 through an external SCSI hard drive.

In July 2016, images were published on a video game forum that appear to show a Super Nintendo Entertainment System cartridge designed to work with the British Telecom variant of the AITB. The cartridge is labeled "BT GameCart" and includes an 8-pin serial connector designed to connect to the Apple System/Peripheral 8 port on the rear of the box. A BT promotional video for the service trial discusses a way users could download and play video games via the system.

=== Specifications ===
The Apple Interactive Television Box is based upon the Macintosh Quadra 605 or LC 475. Because the box was never marketed, not all specifications have been stated by Apple. It supports MPEG-2 Transport containing ISO11172 (MPEG-1) bit streams, Apple Desktop Bus, RF in and out, S-Video out, RCA audiovideo out, RJ-45 connector for either E1 data stream on PAL devices or T1 data stream on NTSC devices, serial port, and HDI-30 SCSI. Apple intended to offer the AITB with a matching black ADB mouse, keyboard, Apple 300e CD-ROM drive, StyleWriter printer, and one of several styles of remote controls.

The hard drive contains parts of a regular North American System 7.1.1 with Finder, several sockets for network connection protocols, and customized MPEG1 decoding components for the QuickTime Player software.

== History ==
A few units contain a special boot ROM which allows the device to boot locally from a SCSI hard drive that has the OS and applications contained within the box; these devices were used primarily by developers inside Apple and Oracle, and for limited demonstration purposes. In normal network use, content and program code was served to the box by Oracle OMS over the network to implement the box's interactivity.

A few hundred to a few thousand units were deployed at Disneyland California hotels and provided in room shopping and park navigation. Approximately 2,500 units were installed and used in consumer homes in England during the second interactive television trial conducted by British Telecom and Oracle, which was in Ipswich, UK. The set-top applications were developed using Oracle's Oracle Media Objects (OMO) product, which is somewhat similar to HyperCard, but was enhanced significantly to operate in a network-based interactive TV environment.

== See also ==
- Macintosh TV
- Apple Pippin
- IPTV (Internet Protocol Television)
