= PowerCD =

CD player by Apple Computer

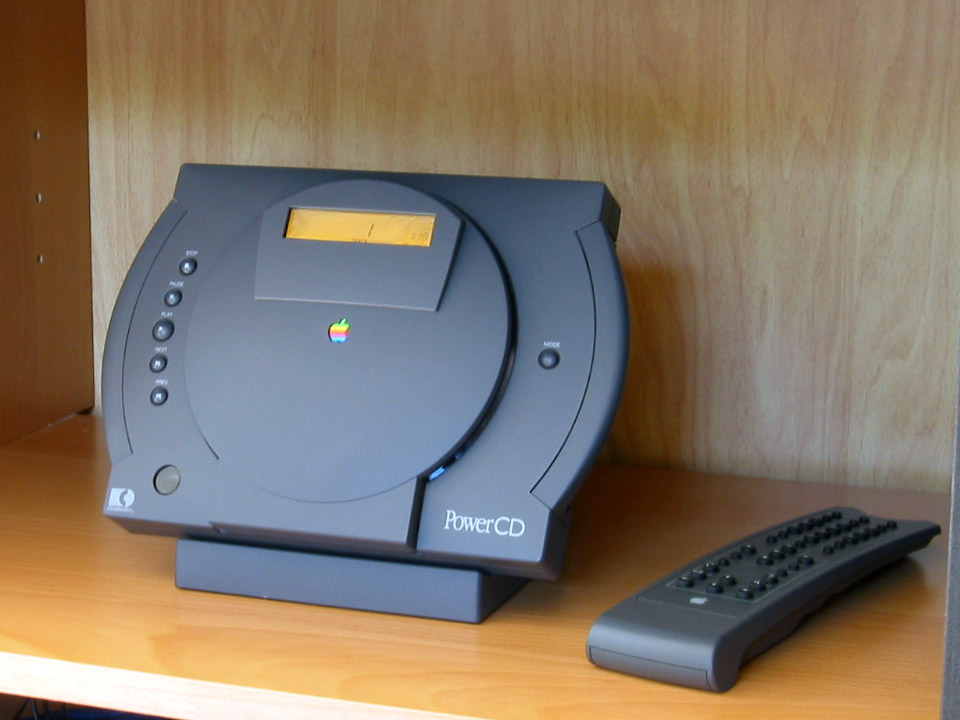
- An Apple PowerCD with its remote control
- Also known as: CDF-100
- Developer: Apple Computer
- Manufacturer: Philips
- Released: 1993
- Introductory price: US$500 (equivalent to $1,114 in 2025)
- Discontinued: 1996
- Dimensions: 6.5 × 8.7 × 4.9 in (165 × 220 × 125 mm)
- Weight: 1.4 kg (3.1 lb)

The PowerCD is a portable CD player sold by Apple Computer beginning in summer 1993. Designed and manufactured by Philips as the CDF-100, it was marketed by Apple as a three-in-one device: an external CD-ROM drive for Macintosh computers, an audio CD player for stereo systems, and a Photo CD player for televisions. It connected to Macintosh computers through SCSI and included a remote control. Its styling matched Apple's PowerBook line, and it was designed to be portable operating on eight AA batteries.

The PowerCD was part of Apple's efforts during the 1990s to branch out beyond computers into consumer electronics. Other products from this period included the QuickTake digital cameras, Pippin game console, Apple Interactive Television Box, and Newton personal digital assistants. None achieved widespread commercial success.

== History ==
In mid-1992, while Apple was developing the Newton, the Apple Industrial Design Group formed a small team called "Mac Like Things" to explore products in the consumer electronics market. Its projects included the PowerCD and the AppleDesign Powered Speakers. By September 1992, the group had been folded into Apple's New Media Group.

The PowerCD combined the functions of a portable audio CD player and an external CD-ROM drive for Macintosh computers. It could also play Photo CD discs and display their images on a television without requiring a computer. The device was intended for use with both desktop Macintosh computers and PowerBook laptops, and could operate from an AC adapter or eight AA batteries. Its portability allowed users to carry it with a PowerBook and use it as an external optical drive. Apple offered separate NTSC and PAL versions for connection to televisions using the respective video standards.

== Features ==
The PowerCD has a 256 KB buffer and an average data access time of 550 milliseconds. Its SCSI interface has a burst transfer rate of approximately 2.1 MB/s. The device has a 50-pin SCSI connector, an 8-pin mini-DIN audio/video output, a stereo audio line output, and a headphone jack. The included remote control operates audio CD playback and Photo CD functions, including viewing, zooming, rotating, and cropping images displayed on a television.

== AppleDesign Powered Speakers ==
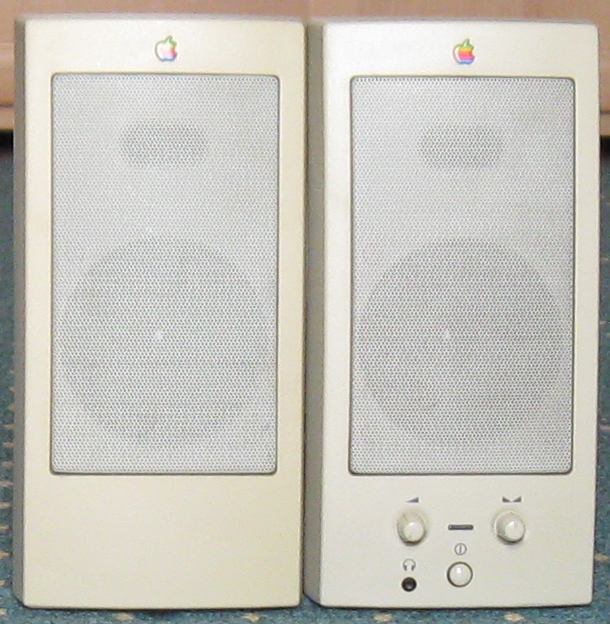
AppleDesign Powered Speakers (M6082)

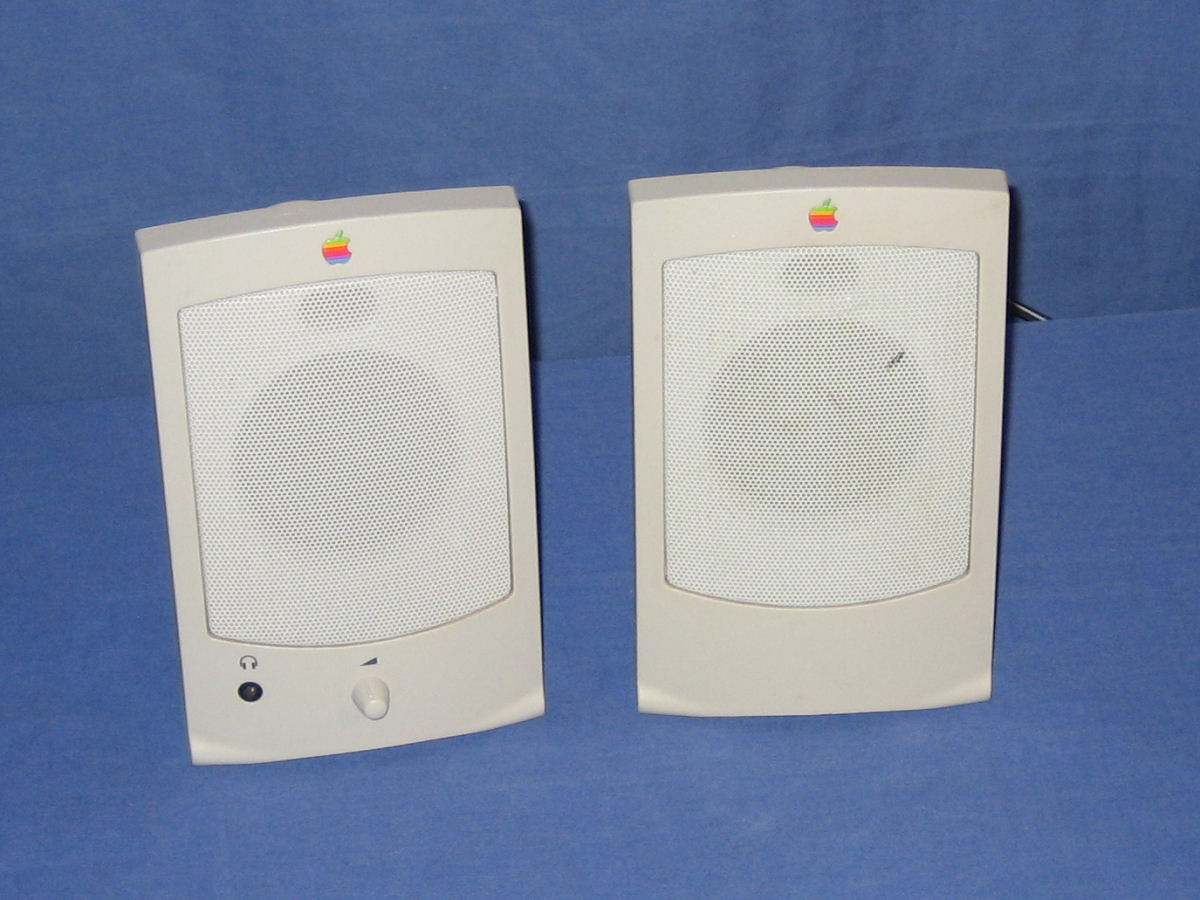
AppleDesign Powered Speakers II

Along with the PowerCD, Apple released two models of their desktop speakers: AppleDesign Powered Speakers and redesigned AppleDesign Powered Speakers II a year later. The original speakers came in platinum gray to match Apple's desktop line, while the second generation were curvier and also came in a darker gray color, designed to match the PowerBook line and PowerCD. Both were powered by an AC adapter and could be attached to any audio output source, with two separate inputs for both a computer and an external CD player. Both models had a headphone jack at the front of one speaker alongside volume control and an optional subwoofer connection port on some models.

== Timeline of Apple products ==
List of Apple products
See also: Timeline of the Apple II series and List of Mac models

Products on this timeline indicate introduction dates only and not necessarily discontinued dates, as new products begin on a contiguous product line.

== See also ==
- iPod
- Apple QuickTake
- Apple Interactive Television Box
- Apple Pippin
