= List of Apple printers =

Apple has produced several lines of printers in its history, but no longer produces or supports these devices today. Though some early products use thermal technology, Apple's products can be broadly divided into three lines: ImageWriter (dot matrix), LaserWriter (PostScript laser), and StyleWriter (thermal inkjet).

== Early products ==
Apple's first printer was the Apple Silentype, released in June 1979, shortly after the Apple II Plus. The Silentype was a thermal printer, which used a special paper and provided 80 column output. Also compatible with the Apple III, the Silentype was a rebranded Trendcom 200.

The Apple Dot Matrix Printer (often shortened to Apple DMP) is a printer manufactured by C. Itoh and sold under Apple label in 1982 for the Apple II series, Lisa, and the Apple III. Apple followed this release with a Qume daisy wheel engine, the Apple Letter Quality Printer (also known as the Apple Daisy Wheel Printer), in January 1983. This printer could print at forty characters per second. Also in 1983, Apple released its only plotter, the Apple Color Plotter. This printer moved and rotated four color pens along the horizontal axis, the device moving the paper into order to allow its pens to render along the vertical axis. The Apple Scribe Printer was a thermal transfer printer, first introduced in 1984 alongside the Apple IIc for a relatively low retail price, and compatible with the Apple IIe computer.

Image	Name	Type	Interface	DPI	Introduced	Discontinued	Notes
Silentype	Silentype	Thermal	serial	N/A	March 1980	October 1982	Uses nonstandard DE-9 pinout
DMP	Dot Matrix Printer	Dot Matrix	parallel	N/A	October 1982	December 1984	9-pin
	Daisy Wheel Printer	Daisy Wheel	serial	N/A	January 1983	December 1984	Offers graphics
Color Plotter	Color Plotter	Plotter	serial	N/A	December 1983	January 1988	
Scribe	Scribe	Thermal	serial	144	April 1984	December 1985	Reviewed

== Dot-matrix series ==
Image	Name	Type	Interface	DPI	Introduced	Discontinued	Notes
ImageWriter	ImageWriter	Dot matrix	serial	144	June 1, 1984	December 1, 1985	9-pin
ImageWriter II	ImageWriter II	Dot matrix	serial	160x144	September 1, 1985	Late 1996	9-pin
ImageWriter II	ImageWriter LQ	Dot matrix	serial	320x216	August 1, 1987	December 1, 1990	27-pin, Letter Quality

== Laser printer series ==
The LaserWriter was a laser printer with built-in PostScript interpreter introduced by Apple in 1985. It was one of the first laser printers available to the mass market. In combination with WYSIWYG publishing software like PageMaker, that operated on top of the graphical user interface of Macintosh computers, the LaserWriter was a key component at the beginning of the desktop publishing revolution.

Image	Name	Type	Interface	Engine	PPM	DPI	Introduced	Discontinued	Weight	Notes
Apple Laserwriter	LaserWriter	PostScript laser	serial LocalTalk	Canon; LBP-CX	8	300	March 1, 1985	February 1, 1988	77 lbs.	
Apple Laserwriter	LaserWriter Plus	PostScript laser	serial LocalTalk	Canon; LBP-CX	8	300	January 1, 1986	February 1, 1988	77 lbs.	
LaserWriter II	LaserWriter II SC	QuickDraw laser	SCSI	Canon; LBP-SX	8	300	January 1, 1988	July 1, 1990	45 lbs.	
LaserWriter II	LaserWriter II NT	PostScript laser	serial LocalTalk	Canon; LBP-SX	8	300	January 1, 1988	October 1, 1991	45 lbs.	
LaserWriter II	LaserWriter II NTX	PostScript laser	serial LocalTalk	Canon; LBP-SX	8	300	January 1, 1988	October 1, 1991	45 lbs.	
LaserWriter II	LaserWriter II f	PostScript laser	serial LocalTalk	Canon; LBP-SX	8	300	October 1, 1991	May 1, 1993	45 lbs.	
LaserWriter II	LaserWriter II g	PostScript laser	serial LocalTalk; AAUI	Canon; LBP-SX	8	300	October 1, 1991	October 1, 1993	45 lbs.	
Personal LaserWriter SC	Personal LaserWriter SC	QuickDraw laser	SCSI	Canon; LBP-LX	4	300	June 1, 1990	September 1, 1993	32 lbs.	
Personal LaserWriter NT	Personal LaserWriter NT	PostScript laser	serial LocalTalk	Canon; LBP-LX	4	300	July 1, 1990	May 1, 1993	32 lbs.	
Personal LaserWriter LS	Personal LaserWriter LS	QuickDraw laser	serial	Canon; LBP-LX	4	300	March 1, 1991	May 1, 1993	31 lbs.	
Personal LaserWriter NTR	Personal LaserWriter NTR	PostScript laser	serial LocalTalk parallel	Canon; LBP-LX	4	300	March 1, 1992	September 1, 1993	29.5 lbs.	
Personal LaserWriter 300	Personal LaserWriter 300	QuickDraw laser	serial	Canon; LBP-PX	4	300	June 1, 1993	September 1, 1994	15.4 lbs.	
Personal LaserWriter 320	Personal LaserWriter 320	PostScript laser	LocalTalk	Canon; LBP-PX	4	300	October 1, 1993	September 16, 1995	15.4 lbs.	
LaserWriter Pro 600	LaserWriter Pro 600	PostScript laser	serial LocalTalk parallel	Canon; LBP-EX	8	600	January 1, 1993	October 1, 1993	39 lbs.	
LaserWriter Pro 630	LaserWriter Pro 630	PostScript laser	serial LocalTalk parallel AAUI	Canon; LBP-EX	8	600	January 1, 1993	September 1, 1994	39 lbs.	
LaserWriter Pro 810	LaserWriter Pro 810	PostScript laser	serial LocalTalk; AAUI	Fuji/Xerox; XP 20	20	800	October 1, 1993	November 1, 1994	81 lbs.	two built-in paper trays
LaserWriter Select 300	LaserWriter Select 300	QuickDraw laser	serial	Fuji/Xerox; XP 5 (P1)	5	300	February 1, 1993	January 3, 1995	26 lbs.	
LaserWriter Select 310	LaserWriter Select 310	PostScript laser	serial parallel	Fuji/Xerox; XP 5 (P1)	5	300	February 1, 1993	January 1, 1994	26 lbs.	
LaserWriter Select 360	LaserWriter Select 360	PostScript laser	serial LocalTalk parallel	Fuji/Xerox; XP 10 (P1)	10	600	October 1, 1993	April 22, 1996	29 lbs.	
LaserWriter 16/600	LaserWriter 16/600 PS	PostScript laser	LocalTalk parallel AAUI	Canon; LBP-EX	17	600	September 1, 1994	June 17, 1996	40 lbs.	
LaserWriter 4/600	LaserWriter 4/600	PostScript laser	LocalTalk	Canon; LBP-PX	4	600	June 1, 1995	unknown	15.4 lbs.	
LaserWriter 12/640	LaserWriter 12/640 PS	PostScript laser	AAUI; LocalTalk parallel	Fuji/Xerox; P893	12	600	June 17, 1996	1997	26.5 lbs.	8 ppm duplex
	LaserWriter 8500	PostScript laser	Ethernet; LocalTalk parallel	Fuji/Xerox; P880	20	600	August 5, 1997	January 1999	70.4 lbs.	11x17 paper tray
Color LaserWriter 12/600	Color LaserWriter 12/600	PostScript laser	Ethernet; LocalTalk parallel	Canon; LBP-HX	12	600	June 1, 1995	October 1, 1996	110 lbs.	3 ppm in color
Color LaserWriter 12/600	Color LaserWriter 12/660	PostScript laser	Ethernet; LocalTalk parallel	Canon; LBP-HX	12	600	October 1, 1996	1997	110 lbs.	3 ppm in color

== Inkjet series ==
The StyleWriter was the first of Apple's line of inkjet serial printers, targeted mainly towards consumers. They produced print quality that was better than the dot matrix ImageWriters, and were cheaper than the LaserWriters. All but a few models contained Canon print engines, a few were rebadged Canon printers, while the last few were rebadged HP DeskJet printers.

The Apple Color Printer was the first color inkjet printer sold by Apple. Introduced in 1993 alongside the StyleWriter II, it was a rebadged Canon BJC-820 printer. Its maximum resolution was 360 DPI and connected to the computer via SCSI. Unlike many inkjet printers of the time, the Apple Color Printer did not suffer from print slowdowns caused by slow communication from the computer performing rasterization, since the SCSI bus is relatively fast. The model was discontinued in 1994 when Apple introduced the Color StyleWriter series of printers.

Image	Name	Type	Interface	Engine	PPM	DPI	Introduced	Discontinued	Weight	Notes
StyleWriter	StyleWriter	monochrome thermal inkjet	serial	Canon	0.5	360	March 1, 1991	January 1, 1993	7.5 lbs.	
StyleWriter II	StyleWriter II	monochrome thermal inkjet	serial	Canon	1	360	January 1, 1993	April 17, 1995	6.6 lbs.	
Portable StyleWriter	Portable StyleWriter	monochrome thermal inkjet	parallel	Canon	0.5	360	June 1, 1993	May 15, 1995	4.5 lbs.	Cable adapter allowed connection to serial
	Color StyleWriter Pro	color thermal inkjet	serial	Canon	2/0.5	360	February 1, 1994	December 16, 1995	11 lbs.	
StyleWriter 1200	StyleWriter 1200	monochrome thermal inkjet	serial	Canon	1	360	April 1, 1994	unknown	6.6 lbs.	
Color StyleWriter 2400	Color StyleWriter 2400	color thermal inkjet	serial	Canon	3	360	September 1, 1994	unknown	7.9 lbs.	LocalTalk option
Color StyleWriter 2200	Color StyleWriter 2200	color thermal inkjet	serial	Canon	3	720x360	June 1, 1995	unknown	3.1 lbs.	portable
	Color StyleWriter 1500	color thermal inkjet	serial	Canon	3	720x360	February 19, 1996	unknown	5.5 lbs.	LocalTalk option, EtherTalk option
Color StyleWriter 2500	Color StyleWriter 2500	color thermal inkjet	serial	Canon	3	720x360	February 19, 1996	unknown	6.9 lbs.	LocalTalk option, EtherTalk option
	Color StyleWriter 4100	color thermal inkjet	serial LocalTalk	HP	5	600	June 16, 1997	unknown	11.7 lbs.	
Color StyleWriter 4500	Color StyleWriter 4500	color thermal inkjet	serial LocalTalk	HP	5	600	June 16, 1997	unknown	11.7 lbs.	
	Color StyleWriter 6500	color thermal inkjet	serial LocalTalk parallel	HP	8/4	600	June 16, 1997	unknown	14.3 lbs.	EtherTalk option
