= MacPublisher =

MacPublisher was the first Desktop Publishing program for the Apple Macintosh, introduced in 1984, the same year that Apple introduced the Macintosh. DTP competitors Ready, Set, Go! and Aldus PageMaker were introduced in 1985 when Apple delivered the 512K Macintosh.

MacPublisher was developed by Bob Doyle and distributed by Boston Software Publishers.

Built on graphics primitives like QuickDraw that Bill Atkinson had originally developed for the Apple Lisa computer, MacPublisher included WYSIWYG layout for multi-column text and graphics. QuickDraw was incorporated in the Pascal toolbox for the new Macintosh and had been the basis for MacPaint.

The Desktop Publishing industry exploded in the year 1985 with the introduction of the Apple LaserWriter printer in January and in July the 512K "Fat Mac" and Aldus Corporation's PageMaker, which rapidly became the DTP industry standard software.

It was Paul Brainerd, Aldus's chairman, who gave the industry the name "desktop publishing." MacPublisher had been called "electronic publishing," after the industry then led by Atex Corporation, of which Brainerd had been a vice president.

MacPublisher was the first non-Apple application program to print in color on the ImageWriter II. It introduced spot color to desktop publishing. MacPublisher III was the first DTP program to rotate text and graphics, using a table look-up for the necessary sine functions in one-degree increments.

MacPublisher builds a page differently from PageMaker and ReadySetGo do; instead of creating an actual image of the page with all the text and graphics, MacPublisher created a page mockup that contains only rectangles that represent the location and size of text and graphic elements, and stored the elements as special text and picture files that you edit separately from the page layout. MacPublisher rebuilds a page whenever it changes. The company says it took this approach to allow creation of master pages, repeating elements, and predefined "canned" page layouts; to help prevent data loss on machines with limited memory (MacPublisher can run with as little as 128K RAM); and to facilitate the programming for the automatic table of contents and automatic page jump ("continued on page x") features. Since the page layout is independent of the text and graphic content, you can easily create publication formats you can reuse as you need them. This reusable formats feature can be especially useful for creating catalogs or other publications in which you want the format to remain the same but in which you need to update or replace information on a regular basis. MacPublisher features either automatic or manual kerning to correct printer spacing idiosyncrasies.

MacPublisher included unusual desktop accessories such as a scissor tool to cut columns of text and paste the remainder into another page, a camera tool for capturing graphics from MacPaint, and a see-through ruler that could be moved around the page for measurements.

MacPublisher was sold in 1986 to Esselte Letraset, whose business in press-down dry transfer lettering was evaporating with competition from laser printers, notably Apple's pioneering LaserWriter printer. It was briefly sold as LetraPage, but dropped from the market when Letraset subsequently acquired Ready, Set, Go! from Manhattan Graphics.
