= Apple Dot Matrix Printer =

Printer manufactured by C. Itoh

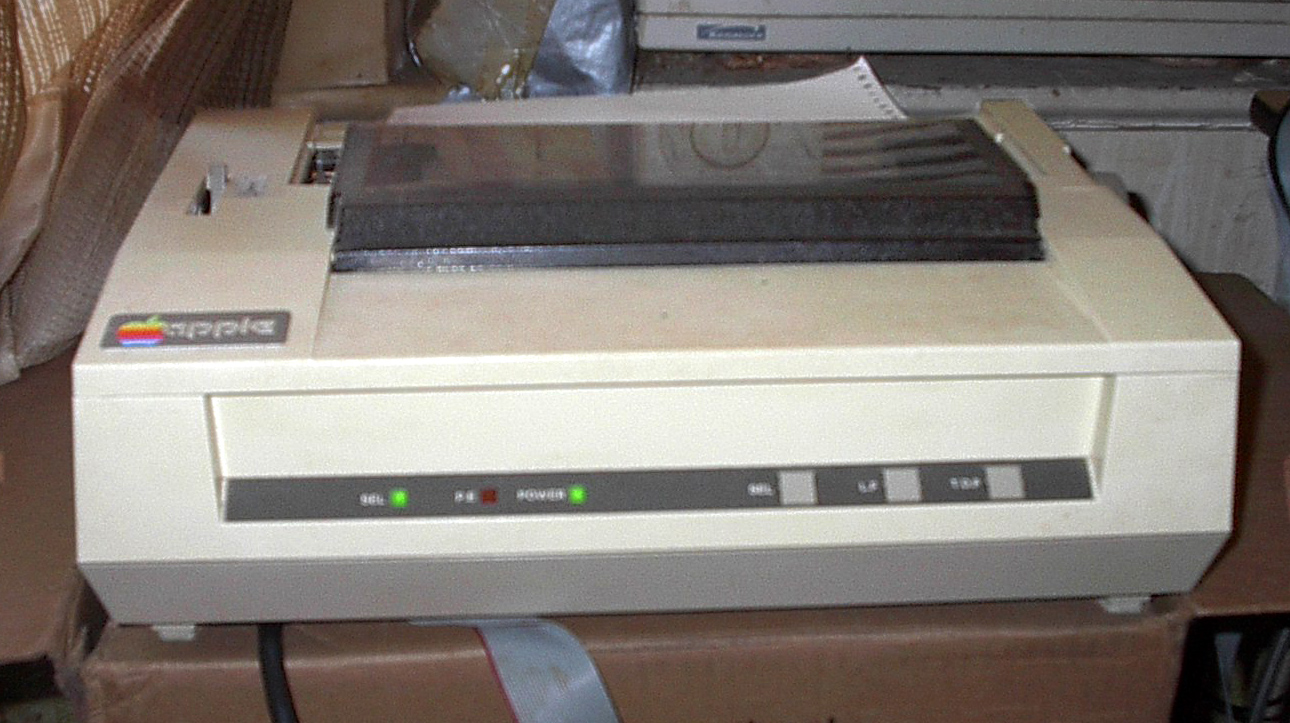
- Introduced: October 1982
- Discontinued: 1984
- Cost: US$699 (equivalent to $2,278 in 2024)
- Type: Dot matrix
- Slots: none
- Ports: Parallel
- Power consumption: 180 Watts
- Color: Black ink fabric ribbon
- Dots per inch: High Resolution: 160 x 144 dpi Normal Resolution: 96 x 72 dpi
- Speed: 70 lines per minute / 120 characters per second (in draft mode)
- Weight: 18.7 lbs
- Dimensions: (H × W × D) 4.75 × 15.5 × 11 in

The Apple Dot Matrix Printer (often shortened to Apple DMP) is a printer that was manufactured by C. Itoh and sold under the Apple Computer, Inc. label in 1982 for the Apple II series, Lisa, and the Apple III. It was succeeded by the ImageWriter in 1984.

The Apple DMP is the last parallel port printer sold under the Apple label; all subsequent Apple printers (ImageWriter, ImageWriter II, Scribe, LaserWriter, etc.) were serial port printers.
