= StyleWriter =

Inkjet printer series by Apple

StyleWriter is a line of inkjet serial printers by Apple, targeted mainly towards consumers. They produced print quality that was better than the dot matrix ImageWriters, and were cheaper than the LaserWriters. All but a few models contained Canon print engines, while the last few were re-badged HP Deskjet printers. When Steve Jobs returned to Apple in 1997, he discontinued most of the company's accessory product lines, including the StyleWriter and LaserWriter.

== Models ==
=== StyleWriter models ===
==== StyleWriter ====
StyleWriter
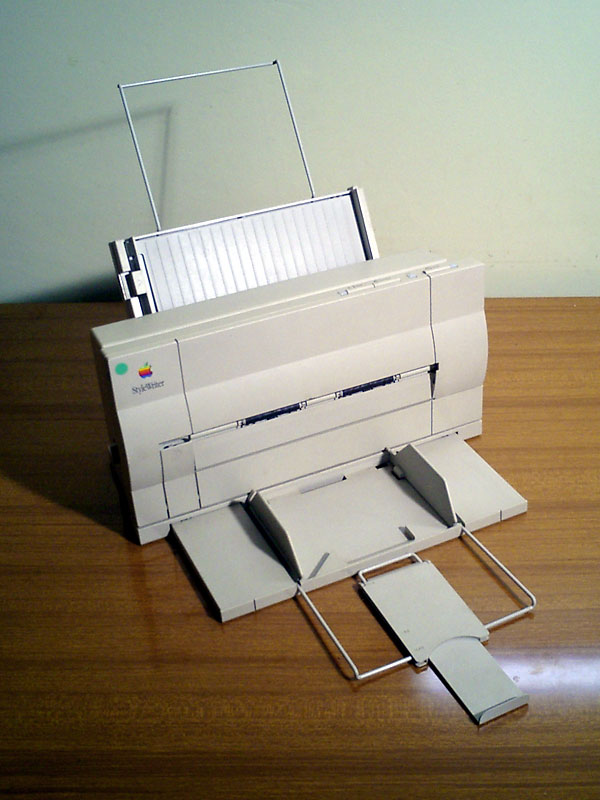
- Introduced: March 1, 1991
- Discontinued: January 1, 1993
- Type: Inkjet
- Memory: 64 KiB
- Slots: 0
- Ports: Serial
- Power consumption: 23 Watt
- Color: 1
- Dots per inch: 360
- Speed: 1 Page per minute
- Language: QuickDraw
- Weight: 7.5 lbs
- Dimensions: (H x W x D) 12.5 x 13.25 x 5.6 in

The StyleWriter was the first of Apple's line of inkjet serial printers, targeted mainly towards consumers. The feed mechanism was removable, and paper could be fed through manually in a virtually straight line.

==== StyleWriter II ====
StyleWriter II
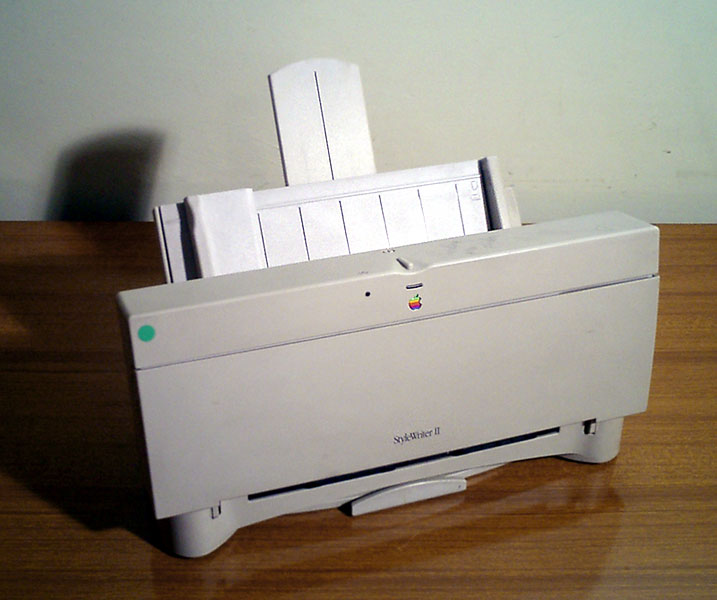
- Introduced: January 1, 1993
- Discontinued: April 17, 1995
- Type: Inkjet
- Memory: 128 kB
- Slots: 0
- Ports: Serial
- Power consumption: 19.5 Watt
- Color: 1
- Dots per inch: 360
- Speed: 2 Page per minute
- Language: QuickDraw
- Weight: 6.6 lbs
- Dimensions: (H x W x D) 7 x 13.6 x 7.9 in

The StyleWriter II replaced the original. This model, based on a Canon engine that printed at 360 dpi, had twice the memory of its predecessor and double the printing speed. The enclosure was restyled in Apple's "neoclassical" design language of the time.

==== StyleWriter 1200 ====
StyleWriter 1200
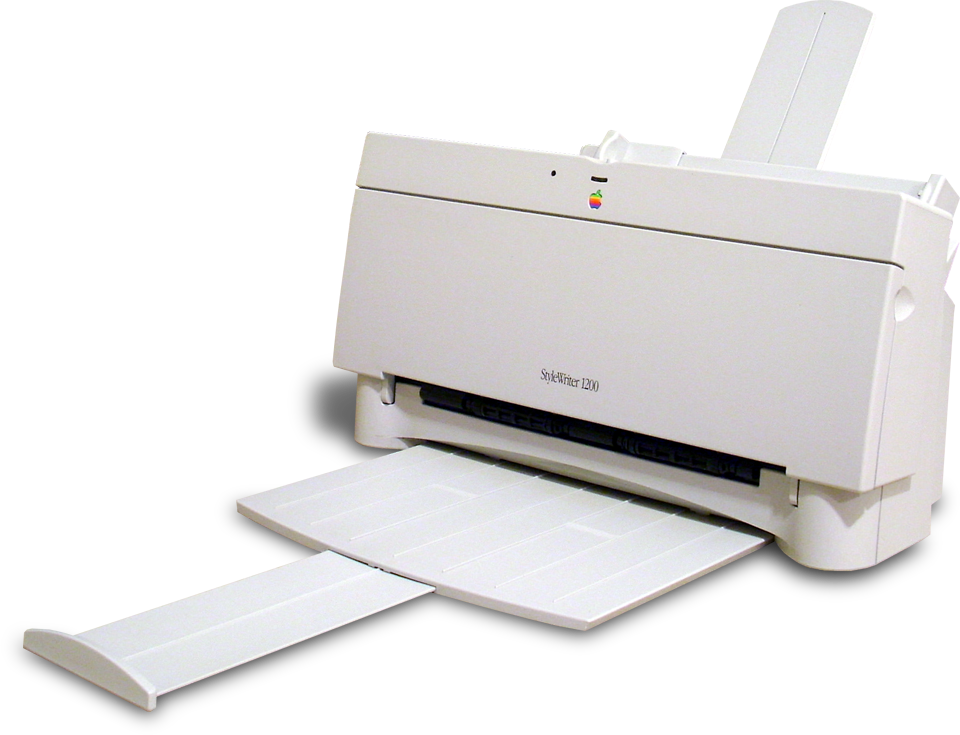
- Introduced: April 1, 1995
- Type: Inkjet
- Memory: 128 kB
- Ports: Serial
- Power consumption: 19.5 Watt
- Color: 1
- Dots per inch: 720 x 360
- Speed: 3 Page per minute
- Language: QuickDraw
- Weight: 6.6 lbs
- Dimensions: (H x W x D) 7 x 13.6 x 7.9 in

The StyleWriter 1200 was the third of Apple's line of inkjet serial printers, released after the StyleWriter II. Based on the same Canon engine, this model had faster printing speed than its predecessor, but used the same ink cartridge.

==== Portable StyleWriter ====
Portable StyleWriter
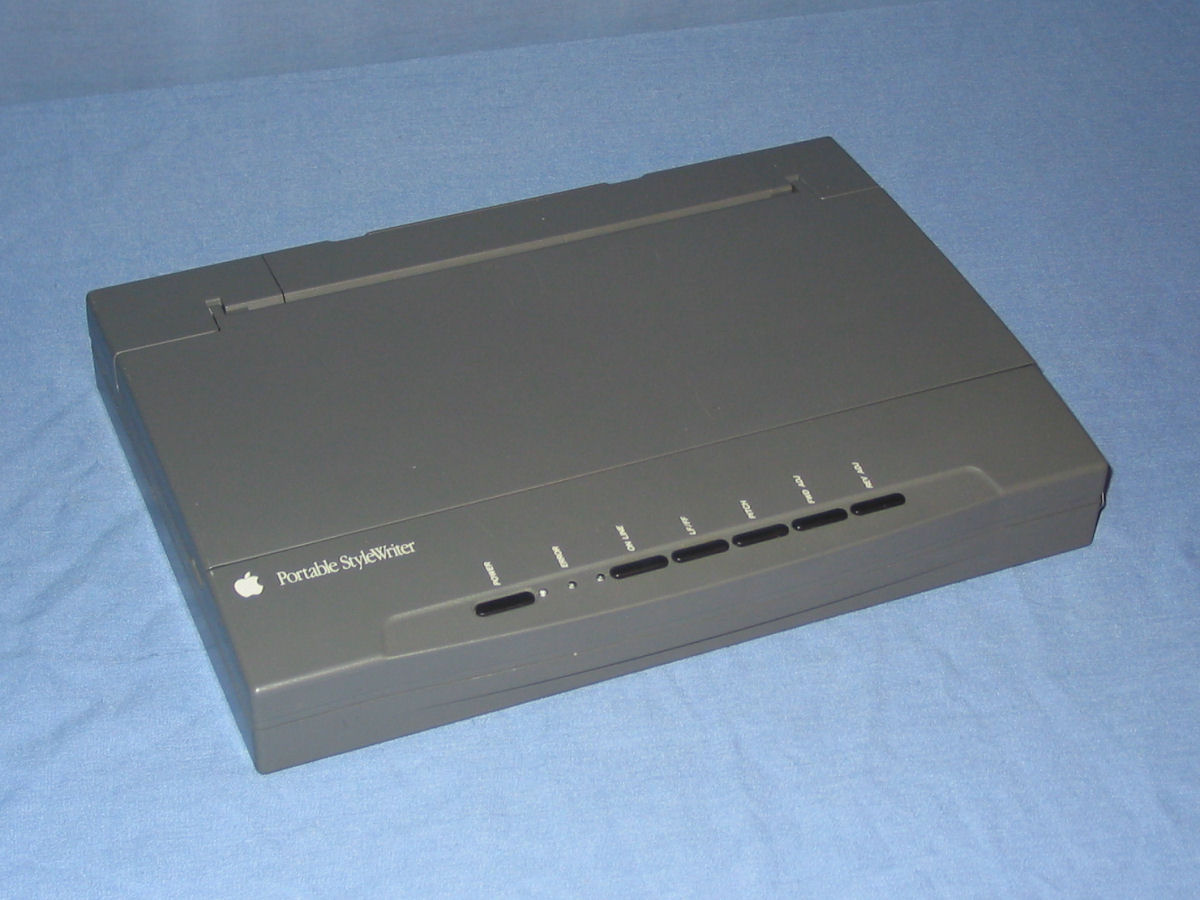
- Introduced: June 1, 1993
- Discontinued: May 15, 1995
- Type: Inkjet
- Ports: Parallel
- Power consumption: 23 Watt
- Color: 1
- Dots per inch: 360
- Speed: 1.5 Pages per minute
- Language: QuickDraw
- Weight: 4.5 lbs
- Dimensions: (H x W x D) 1.9 x 12.2 x 8.7 in

The Portable StyleWriter was a portable inkjet printer manufactured in 1993 and was designed to match the PowerBook 100 Series portable computer. It was powered by a Nickel–cadmium battery or an external AC adapter. It sacrificed ergonomics, printing speed and grayscale for portability. An optional automatic sheet feeder was also available. Unlike most Apple printers, the Portable StyleWriter came only with a Parallel port, but was sold with a cable adapter allowing connection to a Macintosh serial port.

=== Color StyleWriter models ===
==== Color StyleWriter Pro ====
The Color StyleWriter Pro was a color inkjet printer manufactured and sold by Apple in 1994. It was based on the Canon BJC-600 series of Bubble Jet printers, with which it shares ink cartridge compatibility. Its distinguishing feature among Color StyleWriter printers is its use of separate ink cartridges for each of three colors (cyan, magenta, yellow) plus black. In contrast, other Color StyleWriters used a combined color cartridge plus a black cartridge.

==== Color StyleWriter 2400 ====
The Color StyleWriter 2400 is a color inkjet printer manufactured and sold by Apple. It was introduced in late 1994 to supplement the Color StyleWriter Pro as a more affordable product. It uses the same Canon engine as the BJC-4000 and features a 360-dpi resolution, a dual ink cartridge system (1 Black and 1 Cyan-Magenta-Yellow colors) that can be replaced by an alternative high capacity black ink that allows printing twice as fast when only black & white is needed. Its initial Manufacturer's Suggested Retail Price was US$525.

In mid-1995, it saw a software update to bringing new features, as well as a significant price drop.

The Color StyleWriter 2400 is notable for its compatibility with the Apple Pippin console gaming system.

==== Color StyleWriter 2200 ====
The Color StyleWriter 2200 was a color inkjet printer manufactured and sold by Apple in 1995.

The 2200, the color successor of the Portable StyleWriter was aimed at mobile professionals, as it could be powered by a battery and only weighed 3.1 lbs. Its dark grey case design matched the PowerBook series at the time of the release. This was the second and last printer Apple made in this color range. The 2200 was smaller and more rounded, matching the PowerBook 1400 and 5300 series.

==== Color StyleWriter 1500 ====
The Color StyleWriter 1500 was an entry-level Canon-engine color inkjet printer manufactured and sold by Apple in 1996.

==== Color StyleWriter 2500 ====
The Color StyleWriter 2500 was a performance color inkjet printer manufactured and sold by Apple in 1996. It was based on a Canon-developed Bubble Jet printer, but was repackaged with a new housing, firmware, and Apple's proprietary 8-pin mini-DIN serial port. The printer is similar in appearance and functionality to the StyleWriter 2400, but featured faster printing speeds: 5 PPM black, 0.66 color, vs the 2400's 3 PPM black, 0.3 color. As with the 2400, the 2500 was compatible with the Apple Pippin console gaming system. Apple offered LocalTalk and EtherTalk networking upgrades in the form of external print server devices. Also offered was a "PhotoGrade" kit, which included a special monobloc (heads and ink in one unit) cartridge with lighter photo-oriented inks and coated paper.

==== Color StyleWriter 4100, 4500, and 6500 ====
The Color StyleWriter 4100, 4500, and 6500 were color inkjet printers manufactured and sold by Apple in 1997. These models were all rebadged HP DeskJet printers.
