= Aldus PageMaker =

Desktop publishing program

- PageMaker 7.0 running on Mac OS 9
- Other names: Adobe PageMaker (1995–2004)
- Original author: Aldus Corporation
- Developers: Aldus Corporation (1985–1995); Adobe Systems (1995–2004)
- Final release: 7.0.2 / 30 March 2004
- Operating system: Windows XP and earlier Mac OS 9 OS/2 v3.01
- Successor: Adobe InDesign
- Type: Desktop publishing
- License: Trialware

Aldus PageMaker (later Adobe PageMaker) was a desktop publishing (DTP) computer program introduced in 1985 by the Aldus Corporation on the Apple Macintosh. The combination of the Macintosh's graphical user interface, PageMaker publishing software, and Apple LaserWriter printer marked the beginning of the desktop publishing revolution. PageMaker was ported in 1987 to PCs running Windows 1.0, and it helped to popularize both the Macintosh platform and the Windows environment.

A key component in PageMaker's success was its native support for Adobe Systems' PostScript page description language. Adobe purchased the majority of Aldus's assets in 1994, including FreeHand, PressWise, and PageMaker, then phased out the Aldus name. PageMaker remained a major force in the high-end DTP market through the early 1990s, but new features were slow in coming. By the mid-1990s, it faced increasing competition from QuarkXPress on the Mac and Corel Ventura on the PC, and it was no longer a major force by the end of the decade. Quark proposed buying PageMaker and canceling it, but Adobe released Adobe InDesign in 1999 and began to phase out PageMaker. The last major release of PageMaker came in 2001, and customers were offered InDesign licenses at a lower cost.

== Release history ==
- Aldus PageMaker 1.0 was released in July 1985 for the Macintosh and in December 1986 for the IBM PC.
- Aldus PageMaker 1.2 for Macintosh was released in 1986 and added support for PostScript fonts built into LaserWriter Plus or downloaded to the memory of other output devices. PageMaker was awarded a Codie award for Best New Use of a Computer in 1986. In October 1986, a version of PageMaker was made available for Hewlett-Packard's HP Vectra computers. In 1987, PageMaker was available on Digital Equipment's VAXstation computers.
- Aldus PageMaker 2.0 was released in 1987. Until May 1987, the initial Windows release was bundled with a full version of Windows 1.0.3; after that date, a "Windows-runtime" without task-switching capabilities was included. Thus, users who did not have Windows could run the application from MS-DOS.
- Aldus PageMaker 3.0 for Macintosh was shipped in April 1988. PageMaker 3.0 for the PC was shipped in May 1988 and required Windows 2.0, which was bundled as a run-time version. Version 3.01 was available for OS/2 and took extensive advantage of multithreading for improved user responsiveness.
- Aldus PageMaker 4.0 for Macintosh was released in 1990 and offered new word-processing capabilities, expanded typographic controls, and enhanced features for handling long documents. A version for the PC was available by 1991.
- Aldus PageMaker 5.0 was released in January 1993.
- Adobe PageMaker 6.0 was released in 1995, a year after Adobe Systems acquired Aldus Corporation.
- Adobe PageMaker 6.5 was released in 1996. Support for versions 4.0, 5.0, 6.0, and 6.5 is no longer offered through the official Adobe support system. Due to Aldus' use of closed, proprietary data formats, this poses substantial problems for users who have works authored in these legacy versions.
- Adobe PageMaker 7.0 was the final version made available. It was released 9 July 2001, though updates have been released for the two supported platforms since. The Macintosh version runs only in Mac OS 9 or earlier; there is no native support for Mac OS X, and it does not run on Intel-based Macs without SheepShaver. It does not run well under Classic, and Adobe recommends that customers use an older Macintosh capable of booting into Mac OS 9. The Windows version supports Windows XP, but according to Adobe, "PageMaker 7.x does not install or run on Windows Vista."

== End of development ==
The box cover for the InDesign 2 upgrade from PageMaker. This software was the successor to PageMaker.

Development of PageMaker had flagged in the later years at Aldus and, by 1998, PageMaker had lost almost the entire professional market to the comparatively feature-rich QuarkXPress 3.3, released in 1992, and 4.0, released in 1996. Quark stated its intention to buy out Adobe and to divest the combined company of PageMaker to avoid anti-trust issues. Adobe rebuffed the offer and instead continued to work on a new page layout application code-named "Shuksan" (later "K2"), originally started by Aldus, openly planned and positioned as a "Quark killer". This was released as Adobe InDesign 1.0 in 1999.

The last major release of PageMaker was 7.0 in 2001, after which the product was seen as "languishing on life support". Adobe ceased all development of PageMaker in 2004 and "strongly encouraged" users to migrate to InDesign, initially through special "InDesign PageMaker Edition" and "PageMaker Plug-in" versions, which added PageMaker's data merge, bullet, and numbering features to InDesign, and provided PageMaker-oriented help topics, complimentary Myriad Pro fonts, and templates. From 2005, these features were bundled into InDesign CS2, which was offered at half-price to existing PageMaker customers.

No new major versions of Adobe PageMaker have been released since, and it does not ship alongside Adobe InDesign.

== Reception ==
InfoWorld compared PageMaker's importance with that of VisiCalc and Lotus 1-2-3 in September 1985, suggesting that the software was superior to competitors such as Ready, Set, Go! and MacPublisher, as it was easy to learn, powerful, and fast. The magazine stated that "its powers virtually demand a Laserwriter" and concluded that "if your group owns a Laserwriter, you've got to own Page Maker".

BYTE listed PageMaker 3.0 in 1989 as among the "Distinction" winners of the BYTE Awards, stating that it "is the program that showed many of us how to use the Macintosh to its full potential".

InfoWorld said in 1993 that PageMaker 5.0 was superior to QuarkXPress and Ventura Publisher for business publishing.

== File formats ==
Adobe PageMaker file formats use various filename extensions, including PMD, PM3, PM4, PM5, PM6 and P65; these should be readable by the applications Collabora Online, LibreOffice or Apache OpenOffice, they can then be saved into the OpenDocument format or other file formats.
