= Ready, Set, Go! (software) =

- Developer: Diwan
- Stable release: 7.7.8b / September 2009; 16 years ago
- Operating system: Microsoft Windows
- Type: desktop publishing
- License: commercial
- Website: www.diwan.com

Ready, Set, Go! (also styled ReadySetGo and ReadySetGo!; abbreviated RSG!) is a software package for desktop publishing. Originally developed for Apple Computer's Macintosh by Manhattan Graphics, it became one of the earliest desktop publishing packages available for that platform, slightly predating Aldus PageMaker, which ultimately eclipsed RSG! in market share by an order of magnitude by the late 1980s. It was often compared with PageMaker and QuarkXPress in comparative reviews.

It was later acquired by Diwan and is still available today for the Microsoft Windows platform, although Diwan has ceased providing updates since 2009.

== See also ==
- MacPublisher, the first desktop publishing software package for the Macintosh
- Adobe InDesign, which replaced PageMaker after Adobe's acquisition of Aldus
