= ImageWriter =

Dot matrix printers manufactured by Apple

The ImageWriter is a line of dot matrix printers formerly manufactured by Apple Computer, Inc., and designed then to be compatible with their entire line of computers. There were three different models introduced over time, which were popular among Apple II and Mac owners.

== Original ImageWriter ==
ImageWriter
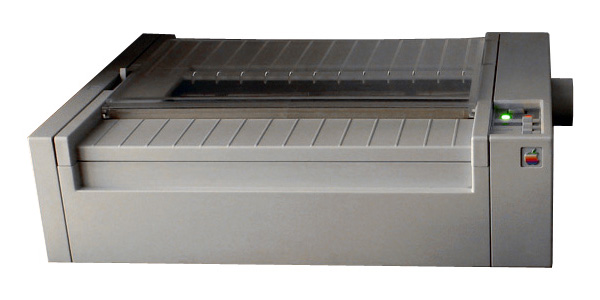
- Design firm: Apple Computer
- Manufacturer: C. Itoh Electronics
- Introduced: December 1, 1983; 42 years ago
- Discontinued: December 1, 1985; 40 years ago
- Cost: US$675 (equivalent to $2,182 in 2025)
- Type: Dot matrix
- Read-only memory: 32 KB
- Ports: Serial
- Power consumption: 180 watts
- Dots per inch: 144
- Speed: 1-2 pages per minute
- Weight: 19 lb (8.6 kg)
- Dimensions: 4.8 × 16.2 × 11.8 in (120 × 410 × 300 mm)

The first ImageWriter is a serial-based dot matrix printer introduced by Apple Computer in late 1983.

The printer was essentially a re-packaged 9-pin dot matrix printer from C. Itoh Electronics (model C. Itoh 8510, with a modified ROM and pinout), released the same year. It was introduced as a replacement for the earlier parallel-based Apple Dot Matrix Printer/DMP (also a C. Itoh model) and, while primarily intended for the Apple II, worked across Apple's entire computer product line. The ImageWriter could produce images as well as text, up to a resolution of 144 DPI and a speed of about 120 CPS (characters per second). In text mode, the printer was logic-seeking, meaning it would print with the head moving in both directions while it would print only in one direction for graphics and Near Letter Quality. The ImageWriter was also supported by the original Macintosh computer, the Macintosh 128K. Apple wanted a graphical printer for the Mac, and had introduced the ImageWriter primarily to support the new machine. This permitted it to produce WYSIWYG output from the screen of the computer, which was an important aspect for promoting the concept of the GUI and, later, desktop publishing. The ImageWriter could be supported by Microsoft Windows-based PC's by using the included C. Itoh 8510 compatible driver.

The ImageWriter was succeeded by the ImageWriter II in late 1985.

A wider version of the ImageWriter, sold as ImageWriter 15", was introduced in January 1984. It allowed printing to 12" wide as well as to 15" wide paper. This version of ImageWriter remained in production for more than a year after the ImageWriter II was introduced. Production was eventually discontinued in January 1987.

=== Accessories ===
In 1984 Thunderware introduced the ThunderScan, an optical scanner that was installed in place of the ImageWriter ribbon cartridge. With support for the Apple II and the Mac, the ThunderScan provided low cost grayscale scanning with moderate resolution and speed.

== ImageWriter II ==
ImageWriter II
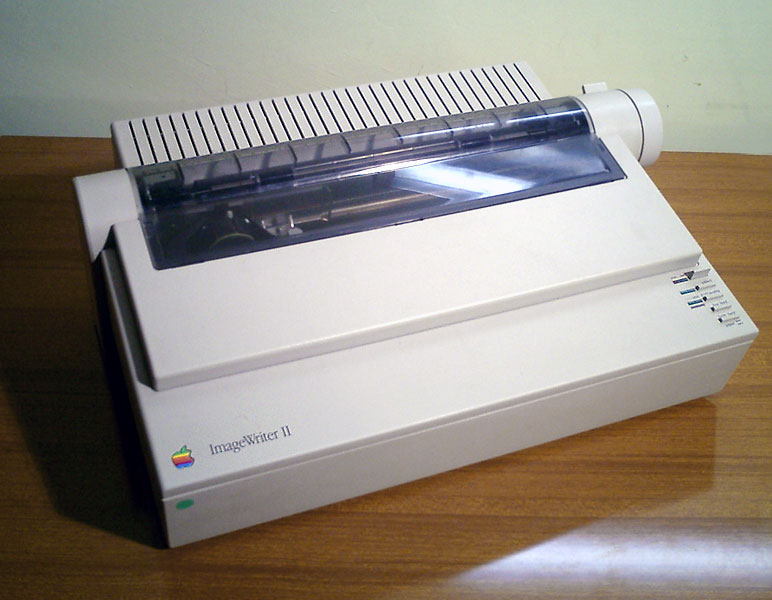
- Design firm: Apple Computer
- Manufacturer: C. Itoh Electronics
- Introduced: September 1985
- Discontinued: Late 1996
- Cost: US $595
- Type: Dot matrix
- Processor: 8 MHz
- Slots: AppleTalk or memory card (optional)
- Read-only memory: 64 KB
- Ports: RS-232 or RS-422 (AppleTalk) serial (Mini-DIN-8 connector)
- Power consumption: 180 watts
- Color: 4
- Dots per inch: 160 × 144
- Speed: 2-6 pages per minute
- Weight: II: 19 lb (8.6 kg); II/L: 15 lb (6.8 kg)
- Dimensions: 5 × 17 × 12 in (130 × 430 × 300 mm)

The ImageWriter II is a serial based dot matrix printer that was manufactured by Apple Computer, which supported its entire computer product line when it was released in September 1985. It had several optional add-ons available, including: a plug-in network card, buffer memory card, and motorized sheet feeder. It also supported color printing with an appropriate ribbon. The codename for the ImageWriter II was "Express"

Compute! reported in 1989 that many believed that the ImageWriter II was inferior to its predecessor. The magazine stated that the first ImageWriter was sturdier, handled paper better, and had better print in most cases.

=== Features ===
The ImageWriter II, like its predecessor, used a 9-pin C. Itoh mechanism. However, the ImageWriter II was significantly faster in draft mode, where it could print 250 characters per second. Color images and text could be produced by using a color ribbon, and eight colors were supported by the original version of QuickDraw on the Mac despite running on a monochrome platform. On the Apple II, complex full-color graphics could be printed. Used with the appropriate software, the ImageWriter II could produce color images with potentially hundreds of simulated colors through dithering.

The ImageWriter II has three ASCII text-quality modes:

1. NLQ (near-letter-quality) at 45 CPS, a feature for very high text quality on the Apple II platform or for improved draft printing quality on the Macintosh platform.
2. Standard (Correspondence) mode at 180 CPS, providing average-quality text.
3. Draft mode at 250 CPS, the fastest output but at the lowest quality level.

In addition to having the same ASCII and European-language characters found in the original ImageWriter, the ImageWriter II added 32 MouseText characters.

The ImageWriter II was designed in accordance with Apple's Snow White design language. In 1986, it received the I.D. Design Review and Silver International Design Excellence Awards, making it the first desktop printer to receive such approbation.

=== Add-on accessories ===
The printer had an expansion socket under the front cover which could accommodate either Apple's AppleTalk network card or 32K memory buffer card, but not both at the same time. Sequential Systems produced a 2-in-1 solution card that combined both features into one card, as well as larger memory buffer cards up to 1 MB. With an optional AppleTalk networking card installed, it was a low-cost alternative to the vastly more expensive LaserWriter. Another third-party innovation was an add-on peripheral called the ThunderScan, which allowed the printer to work as a low-cost optical scanner (in which the scanner mechanism temporarily replaced the ink ribbon cartridge).

The ImageWriter II also supported an optional motorized sheet feeder that could feed cut-sheet paper.

=== Revisions ===
- The original Imagewriter II (1985) closely followed Apple's Snow white design introduced with the Apple IIc, and was one of the few peripherals that matched its creamy off-white color scheme known at Apple as Fog. This model is recognizable for being white in color and not having the product name on the front cover. There were many ROM revisions produced for this and later ImageWriter IIs, made visible through a self-test (pressing the form feed button while turning the ImageWriter on, then releasing both buttons simultaneously; the printer would then print the ROM version as well as DIP switch settings). The printer came with a small built-in 2K RAM memory buffer, with option to expand.
- The second ImageWriter II (1986) changed to the standard warm-grey Apple "Platinum" color. This model is not only recognizable for being light grey in color, but for having the product name printed beside the rainbow Apple logo. It was introduced at roughly the same time as the Apple IIGS in late 1986, to match its then-new Platinum color scheme which was later adopted by all other computers at Apple.
- The third revision, the ImageWriter II/L (1990) as it was known internally, offered some slight design improvements. The internal power source changed to a switching power supply, reducing the overall weight of the printer by 10 pounds. As a result of the change, power and serial interface ports were moved from the legs to either ends of the tractor-feed housing. This model also increased the built-in buffer memory to 24K RAM, eliminating the need for the memory-expansion option. The expansion socket was still present for supporting an optional AppleTalk network card.

The ImageWriter II was compatible with Microsoft Windows-based computers using the operating systems' included C-Itoh 8510 driver, while color support was available through third-party drivers. The only requirement was an available serial port and appropriate interface cable.

Despite the introduction of the inkjet StyleWriter in 1991, the ImageWriter II kept selling. It continued in production until late 1996.

=== In popular culture ===
On the 2000 album A Spectrum of Infinite Scale, surf-rock band Man or Astro-man? included the song "A Simple Text File". The song is a recording of the sound of an ImageWriter II printing a carefully crafted file.

An ImageWriter can also be seen the music video for Marilyn Manson's "The Dope Show."

== ImageWriter LQ ==
ImageWriter LQ
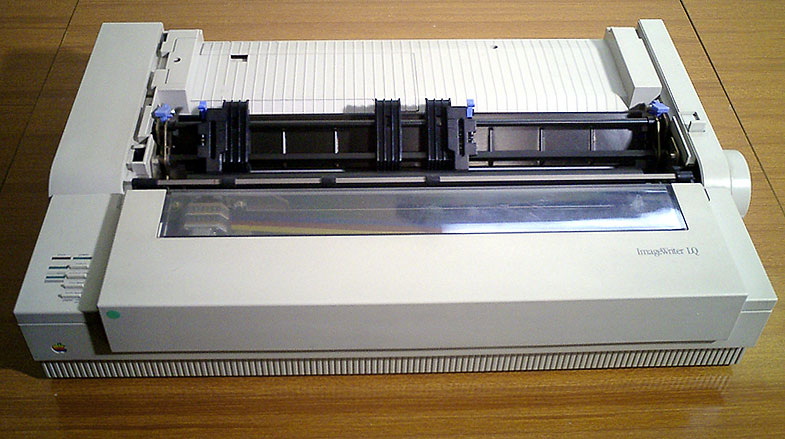
- Design firm: Apple Computer
- Introduced: August 1987
- Discontinued: December 1990
- Cost: US$1,399 (equivalent to $3,965 in 2025)
- Type: Dot matrix
- Ports: Serial
- Power consumption: 180 watts
- Color: 1 (4 optional)
- Dots per inch: 216
- Speed: 0.3 pages per minute
- Weight: 38 lb (17 kg)
- Dimensions: 5.12 × 23.2 × 15 in (130 × 589 × 381 mm)

ImageWriter LQ (Letter Quality) is a 27-pin dot matrix printer introduced in 1987 by Apple Computer, Inc. The print quality was comparable to competing 24-pin dot-matrix printers, and offered graphics at 320 × 216 DPI.

The LQ had more options than any of the other Apple dot-matrix printers, including:

- ImageWriter II/LQ LocalTalk Option card or 32K memory buffer card
- Cut Sheet Feeder (US$299)
- Additional paper bins (US$169, each - maximum of 2) for the sheet feeder
- Envelope Feed for the sheet feeder (US$49)
- SCSI interface (not released)

Color ribbons were $149 for a box of six.
