= Apple Silentype =

Apple Computer's first printer

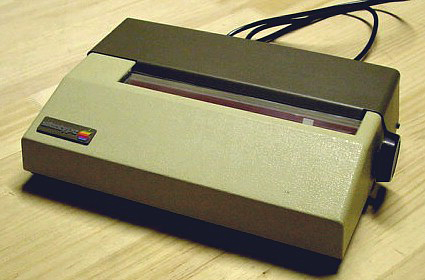
- An Apple Silentype
- Developer: Trendcom
- Manufacturer: Trendcom
- Type: Thermal Printer
- Released: June 1980
- Introductory price: US$599
- Operating system: Apple Pascal, BASIC, and machine language
- Graphics: Text Mode: 40 characters/second, 10 characters/inch; Graphics Mode: 1680 dots/second, 60 dots/inch
- Dimensions: 7.75x12.25x2.75 inches
- Weight: 6 lb (empty)
- Model Number: A2M0032

The Apple Silentype is a thermal printer developed by Trendcom and sold by Apple Computer, Inc. in 1980. The Silentype is an Apple-branded version of Trendcom’s Model 200 printer, and was announced in June 1979 following the release of the Apple II Plus.

The Silentype was released in March 1980 for US$599 as Apple’s first printer, and uses a special thermal paper and provides an 80-column output. It was able to be programmed with Pascal, BASIC, as well as machine language, and is compatible with both the Apple II Plus and Apple III. The Silentype's firmware was written by Andy Hertzfeld, who later worked on the Apple Macintosh.

The Silentype's many dramatic advantages over other printers at the time, including silent operation, very small size, print speed and reliability, were especially well-suited for its use in the nascent point-of-sale and hospitality industries. The Silentype was the first printer to be used in any restaurant as a point-of-sale remote requisition printer to speed service. The broadening use of printers in the hospitality industry subsequently played a key role in the advancement of efficiency throughout the hospitality industry worldwide. The typical point-of-sale hospitality printer in use today, forty years later, is a thermal printer that still mimics the way the Silentype was used when it was introduced in 1980.
