= Apple 410 Color Plotter =

Color plotter printer by Apple

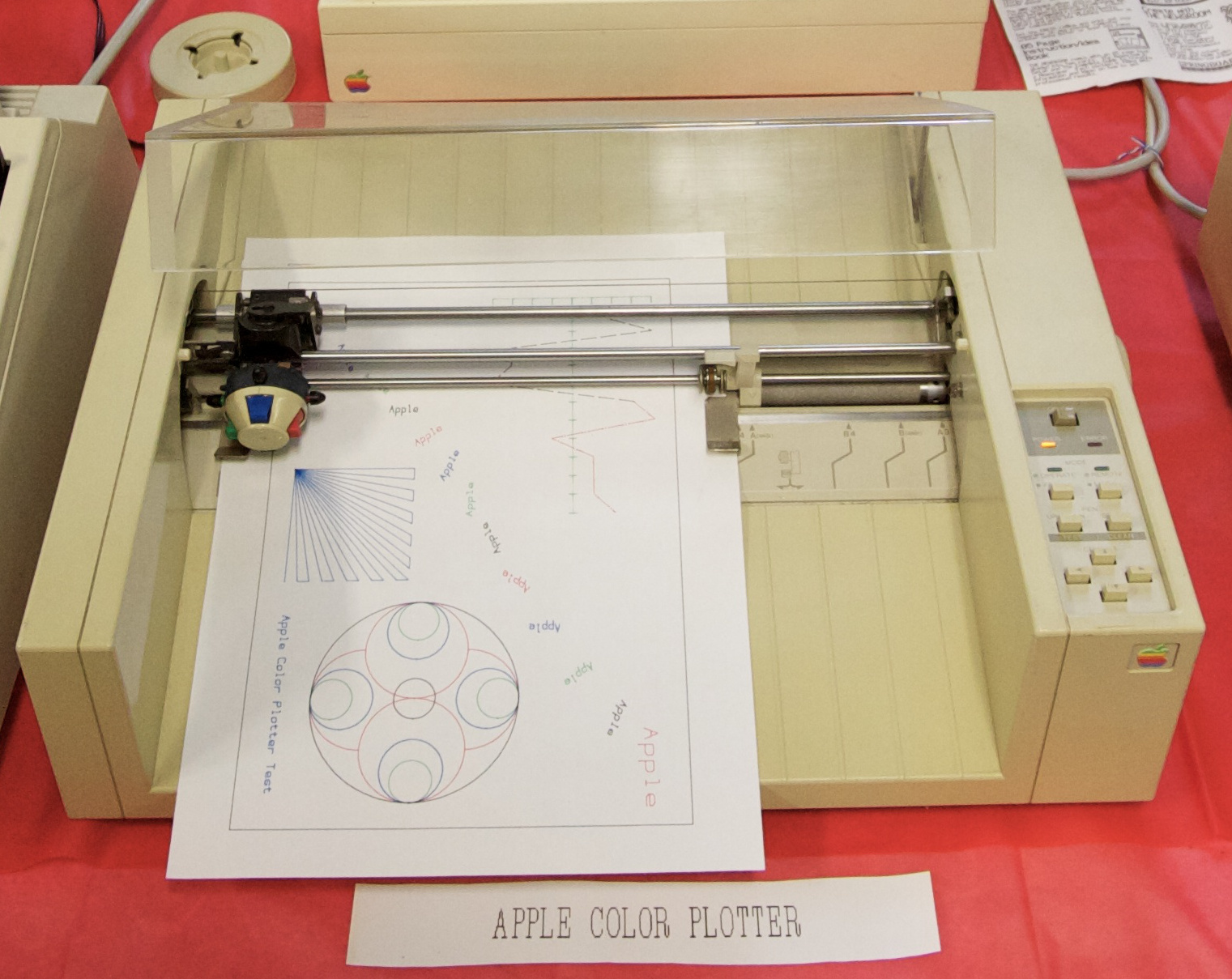
- Working Apple Color Plotter with self-test sheet in 2012
- Introduced: 1983
- Discontinued: 1988
- Cost: US$1,200 (equivalent to $3,788 in 2024)
- Type: Plotter
- Ports: RS-232
- Color: 4
- Language: YEWPL (9 line styles, 15 special symbols)
- Dimensions: (H × W × D) 4.75 × 15.5 × 11 in

The Apple 410 Color Plotter (OEM Yokogawa's YEW PL-1000) is a color plotter printer that was sold by Apple Computer, Inc. from 1983 to 1988. The colors came in either water- or oil-based inks.

The printer could be connected to an Apple II (with an installed Super Serial Card) or Apple III computer.

== Commands ==
eagle.def entry

[YEWPL]
Type     = PenPlotter
Long     = "Yokogawa PL 1000 plotter"
Init     = "IP 0;IW 0,0,380,250; IP 1;\n"
Reset    = "MA 0,0\n"
Width    = 16
Height   = 12
ResX     = 254
ResY     = 254
PenSelect  = "PS %u\n"
PenSpeed   = "PV %1.0f\n"
Move       = "MA %d,%d\n"
Draw       = "DA %d,%d\n"
PenCircleRxCxCy = "AC %d,%d,%d\n"
