= Thermal printing =

Method of digital printing

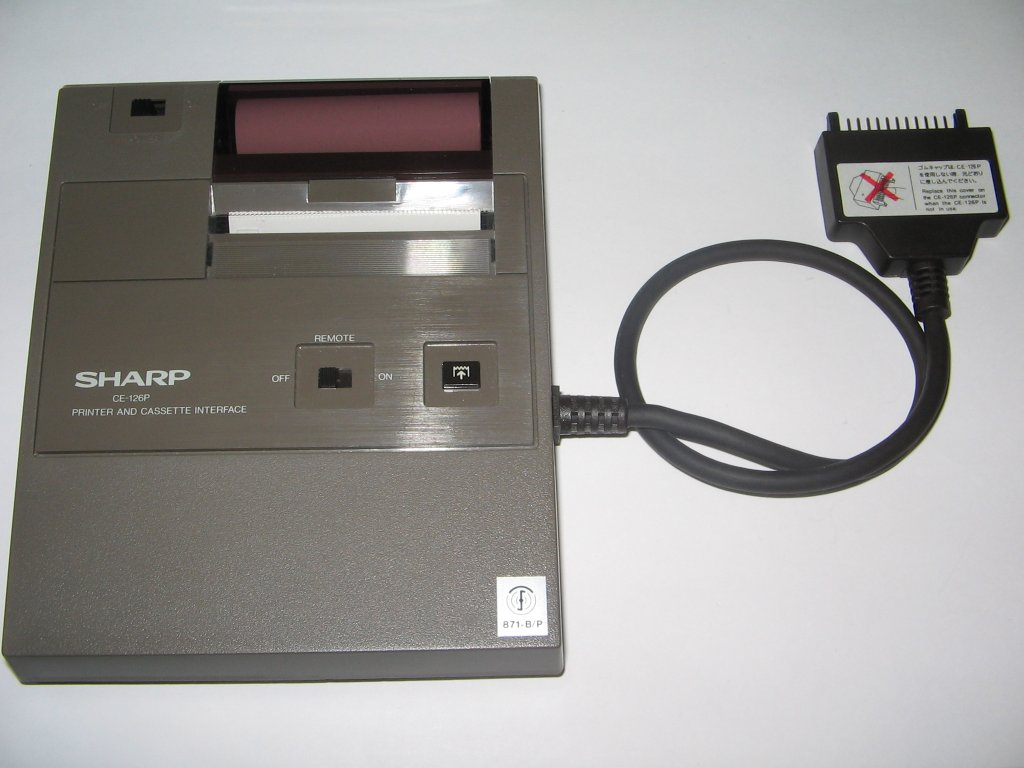
A thermal printer

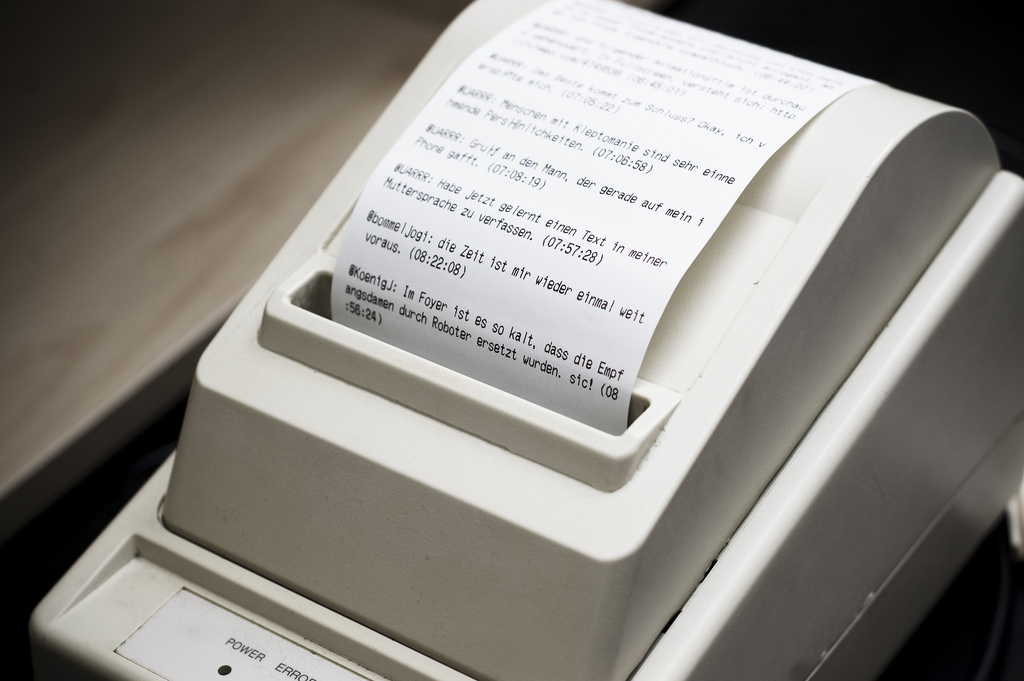
Bills and receipts are typically printed on thermal paper.

Thermal printing (or direct thermal printing) is a digital printing process which produces a printed image by passing paper with a thermochromic coating, commonly known as thermal paper, over a print head consisting of tiny electrically heated elements. The coating turns black in the areas where it is heated, producing an image.

Most thermal printers are monochrome (black and white) although some two-color designs exist. Grayscale is usually rasterized because it can only be adjusted by temperature control.

Thermal-transfer printing is a different method, using plain paper with a heat-sensitive ribbon instead of heat-sensitive paper, but using similar print heads. Thermal transfer printer require the use of wax-based ribbons that adhere to the substrate during the printing process. As a result, users must load both labels and ribbon, essentially using an alternative ink system.

== Design ==
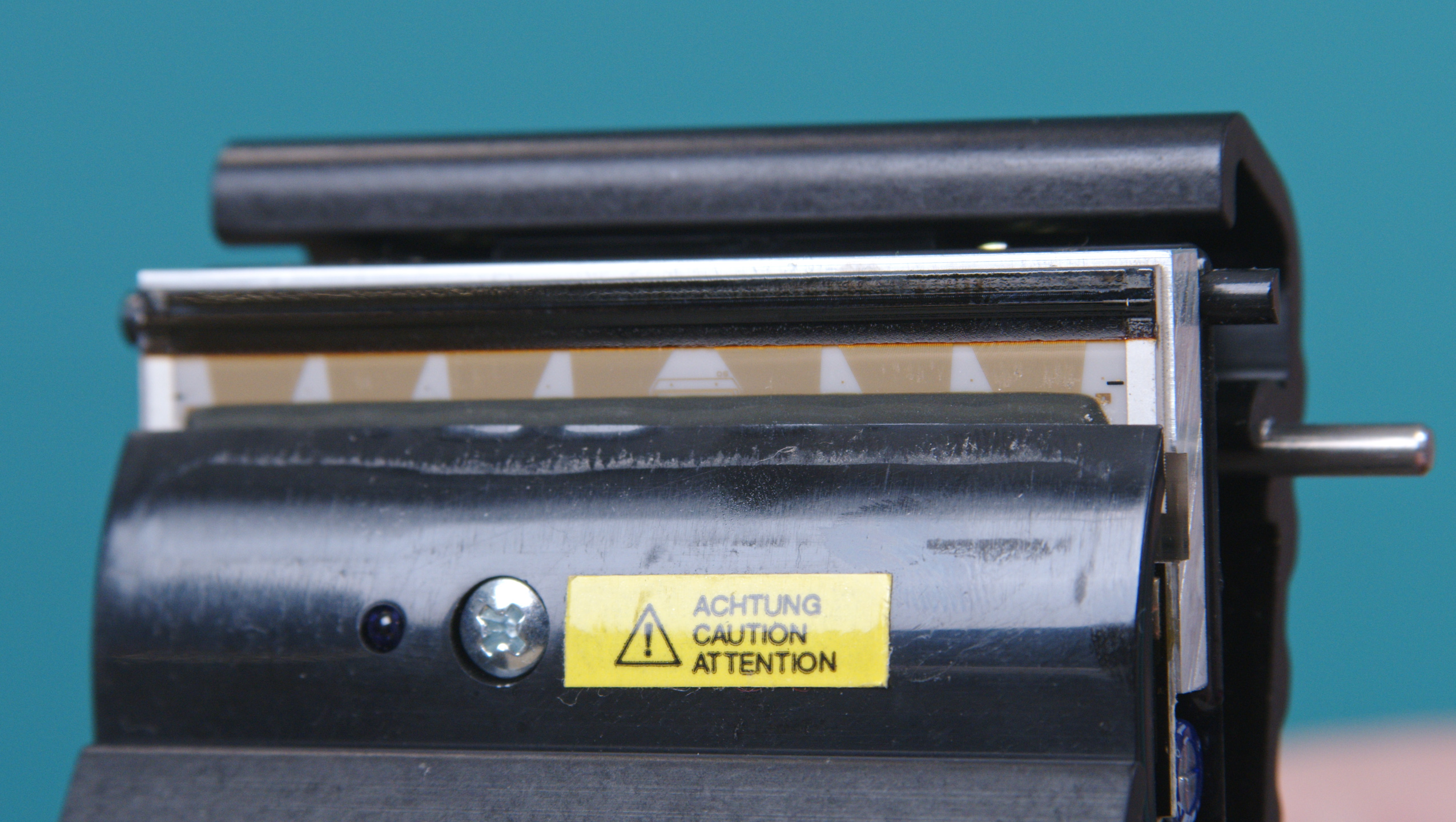
A thermal print head

A thermal printer typically contains at least these components:

- Thermal head: Produces heat to create an image on the paper
- Platen: A rubber roller which moves the paper
- Spring: Applies pressure to hold the paper and printhead together

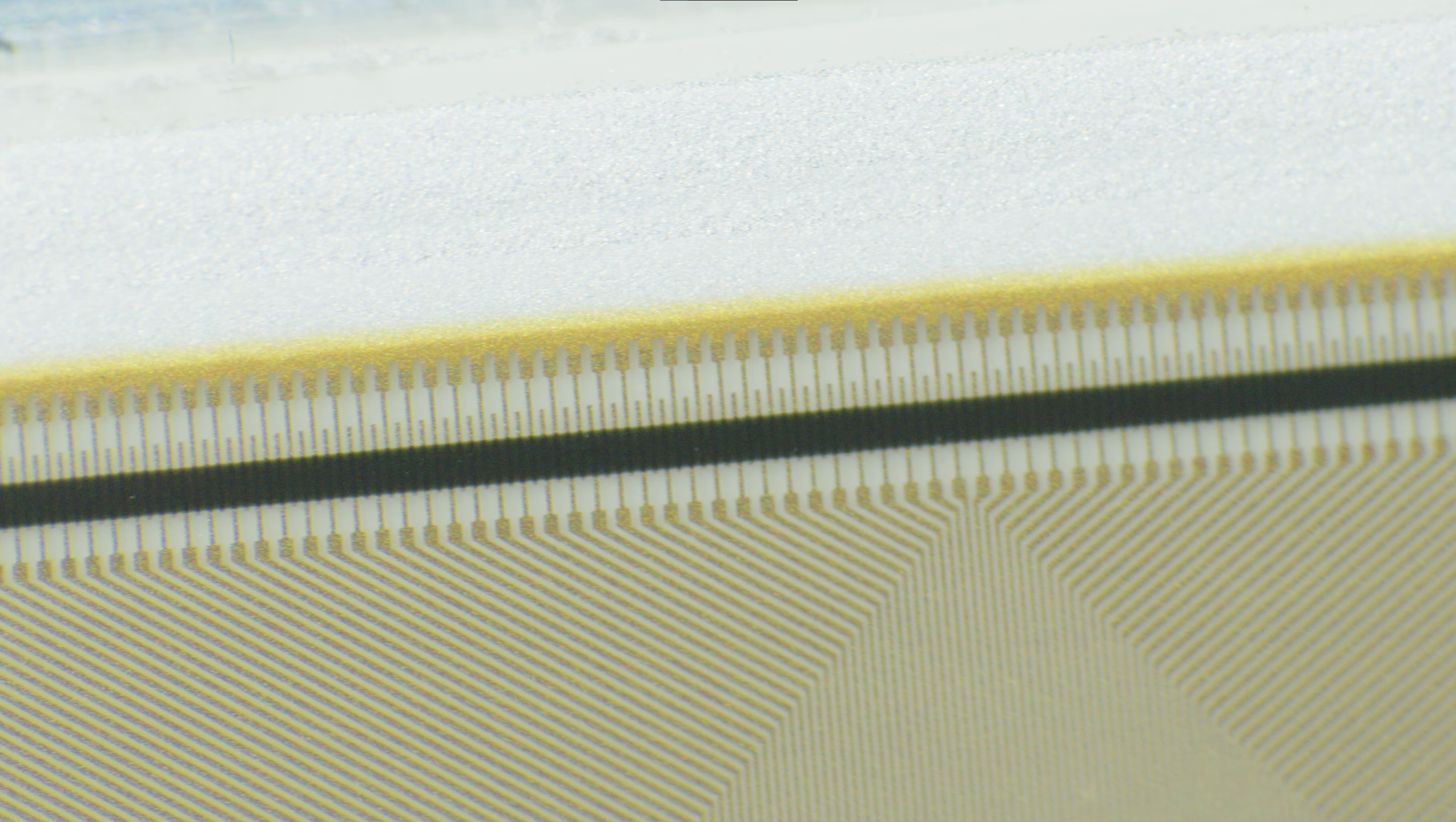
Thermal print head at high magnification

Thermal paper is impregnated with a solid-state mixture of a dye and a suitable matrix, for example, a fluoran leuco dye and an octadecylphosphonic acid. When the matrix is heated above its melting point, the dye reacts with the acid, shifts to its colored form, and the changed form is then conserved in metastable state when the matrix solidifies back quickly enough, a process known as thermochromism.

This process is usually monochrome, but some two-color designs exist, which can print both black and an additional color (often red) by applying heat at two different temperatures.

In order to print, the thermal paper is inserted between the thermal head and the platen and pressed against the head. The printer sends an electric current to the heating elements of the thermal head. The heat generated activates the paper's thermochromic layer, causing it to turn a certain color (for example, black).

Thermal print heads can have a resolution of up to 1,200 dots per inch (dpi). The heating elements are usually arranged as a line of small closely spaced dots.

Early formulations of the thermo-sensitive coating used in thermal paper were sensitive to incidental heat, abrasion, friction (which can cause heat, thus darkening the paper), light (which can fade printed images), and water. Later thermal coating formulations are far more stable; in practice, thermally printed text should remain legible for at least 50 days.

== Applications ==
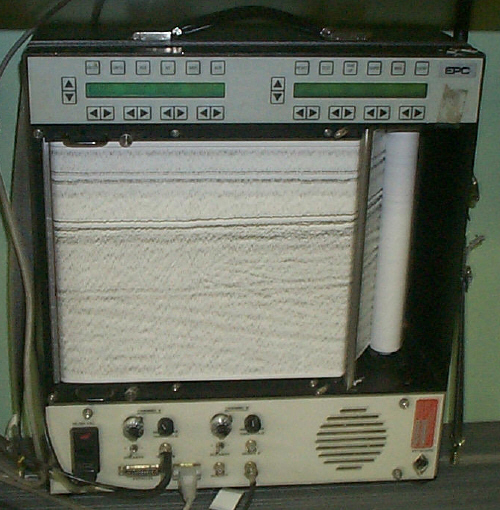
Thermal printer used in seafloor exploration

Thermal printers print more quietly and usually faster than impact dot matrix printers. They are also smaller, lighter and consume less power, making them ideal for portable and retail applications.

=== Commercial use ===
Commercial applications of thermal printers include filling station pumps, information kiosks, point of sale systems, voucher printers in slot machines, print on demand labels for shipping and products, and for recording live rhythm strips on hospital cardiac monitors.

=== Record-keeping in microcomputers ===
Many popular microcomputer systems from the late 1970s and early 1980s had first-party and aftermarket thermal printers available for them, such as the Atari 822 printer for the Atari 8-bit computers, the Apple Silentype for the Apple II, and the Alphacom 32 for the ZX Spectrum and ZX81. They often use unusually-sized supplies (10CM wide rolls for the Alphacom 32 for instance) and were often used for making permanent records of information in the computer (graphics, program listings etc.), rather than for correspondence.

=== Fax machines ===
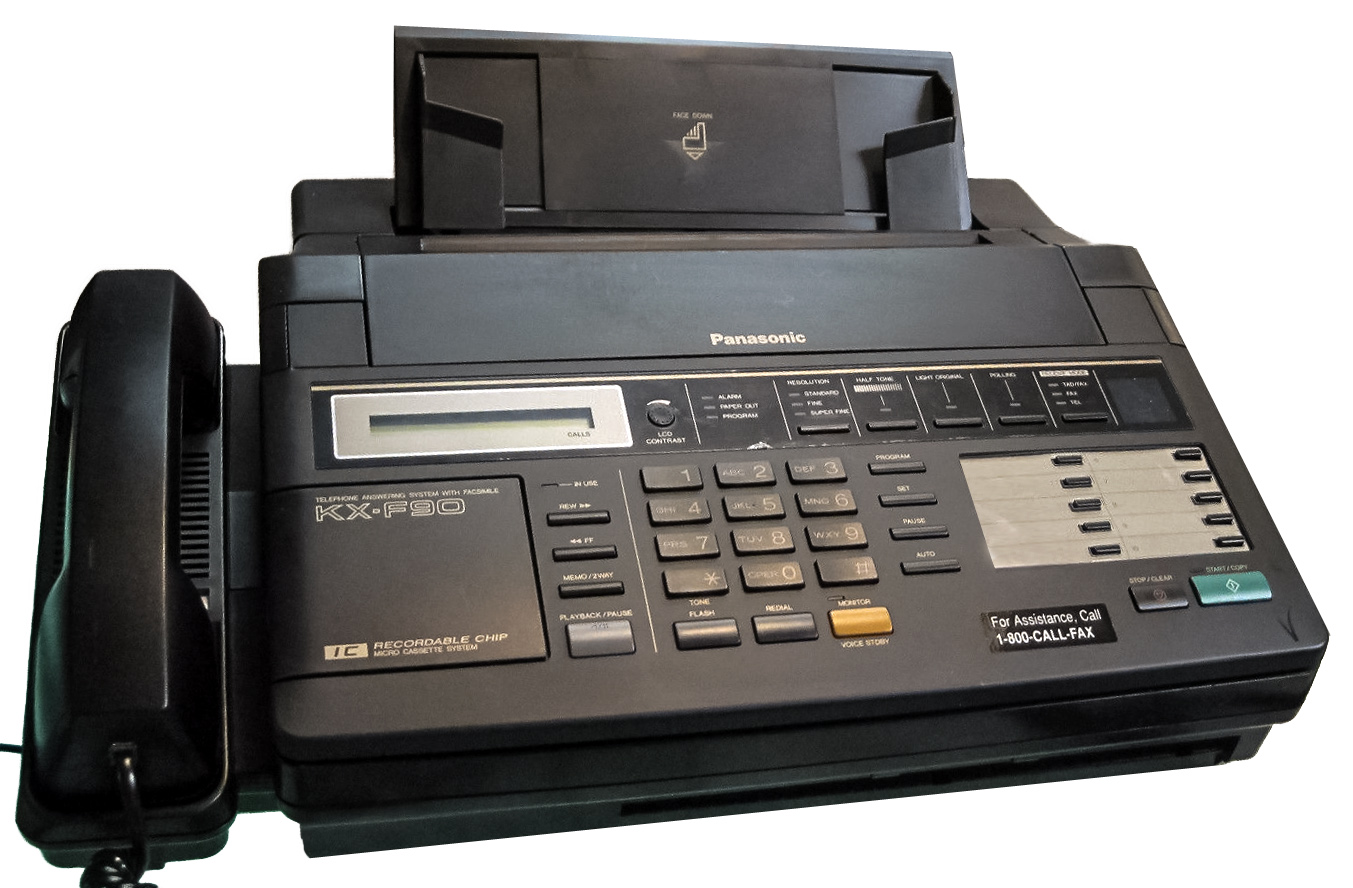
A fax machine from Panasonic with integrated answering machine, beginning of the 1990s. The thermal paper was sold in rolls which were inserted into a compartment in the device. After a completed transmission, the printed document was automatically cut off from the roll and remained in front of the machine.

Through the 1990s, many fax machines used thermal printing technology. Toward the beginning of the 21st century, however, thermal wax transfer, laser, and inkjet printing technology largely supplanted thermal printing technology in fax machines, allowing printing on plain paper.

=== Seafloor exploration ===
Thermal printers are commonly used in seafloor exploration and engineering geology due to their portability, speed, and ability to create continuous reels or sheets. Typically, thermal printers found in offshore applications are used to print real-time records of side scan sonar and sub-seafloor seismic imagery. In data processing, thermal printers are sometimes used to quickly create hard copies of continuous seismic or hydrographic records stored in digital SEG Y or XTF form.

=== Other uses ===
Flight progress strips used in air traffic control (ACARS) typically use thermal printing technology.

In many hospitals in the United Kingdom, many common ultrasound sonogram devices output the results of the scan onto thermal paper. This can cause problems if the parents wish to preserve the image by laminating it, as the heat of most laminators will darken the entire page—this can be tested beforehand on an unimportant thermal print. An option is to make and laminate a permanent ink duplicate of the image.

The Game Boy Printer, released in 1998, was a small thermal printer used to print out certain elements from some Game Boy games.

== Health concerns ==
Reports began surfacing of studies in the 2000s finding the estrogen-related chemical bisphenol A ("BPA") mixed in with thermal (and some other) papers. While the health concerns are very uncertain, various health and science oriented political pressure organizations, such as the Environmental Working Group, have pressed for these versions to be pulled from market.

== History ==
Thermal printing was first used in the 1930s in electrocardiograph recorders. In 1950, this technology was used by 3M in the Thermofax copy machine. However, the first versions of this process were based on the destruction by temperature of a white dye layer, under which was placed a paper pre-colored in black or other contrasting color. This process was unreliable and was later replaced by a better process based on leucopigments, first introduced by NCR for military communications in the 1960s.

== See also ==
- Barcode printer
- Dye-sublimation printer
- Label printer
- Label printer applicator
- LightScribe
- Line matrix printer
- Line printer
- Thermographic printing
