= Color LaserWriter =

Four-color laser printer

Color LaserWriter 12/600 PS
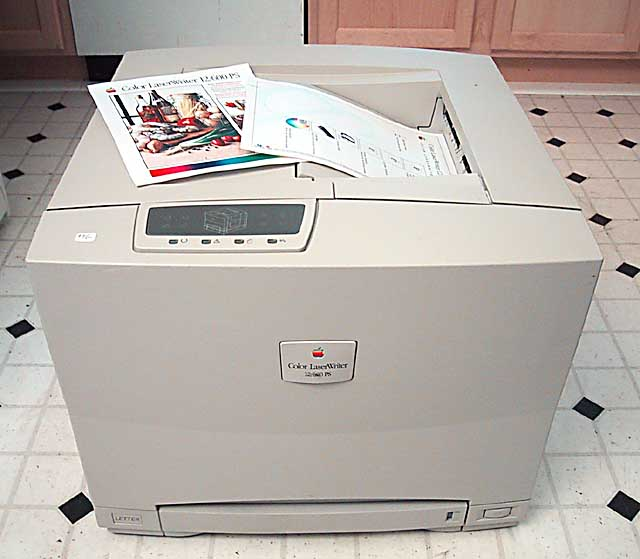
- Introduced: June 1995
- Discontinued: October 1996
- Type: Laser
- Processor: AMD 29030
- Frequency: 30 MHz
- Memory: 12 MB–40 MB
- Slots: 2
- Read-only memory: 4 MB
- Ports: Serial, Parallel, SCSI, LocalTalk, Ethernet
- Power consumption: 1100 Watts
- Color: 4
- Dots per inch: 600
- Speed: 12 Pages Per Minute in B&W, 3 Pages Per Minute in color
- Language: PostScript Level 2
- Weight: 110 lb
- Dimensions: (H x W x D) 18 x 21 x 23 in

The Color LaserWriter was a line of PostScript four-color laser printers manufactured by Apple Computer, Inc. in the mid-1990s. These printers were compatible with PCs and Apple's own Macintosh line of computers; these printers were also able to connect to large networks by way of the use of an 10baseT Ethernet port. Two models were released.

== Color LaserWriter 12/600 PS ==
A PostScript printer, the Color LaserWriter 12/600 PS color laser printer was intended for small business and consumers with high printing requirements. The Windows-compatible driver was of interest due to its ability generate Postscript files (.ps) for later printing.

This printer was released in 1995, one year before its replacement with the Color LaserWriter 12/660 PS, which had the same specifications as the 12/600 PS, but was sold at a lower price.

== Color LaserWriter 12/660 PS ==
Color LaserWriter 12/660 PS
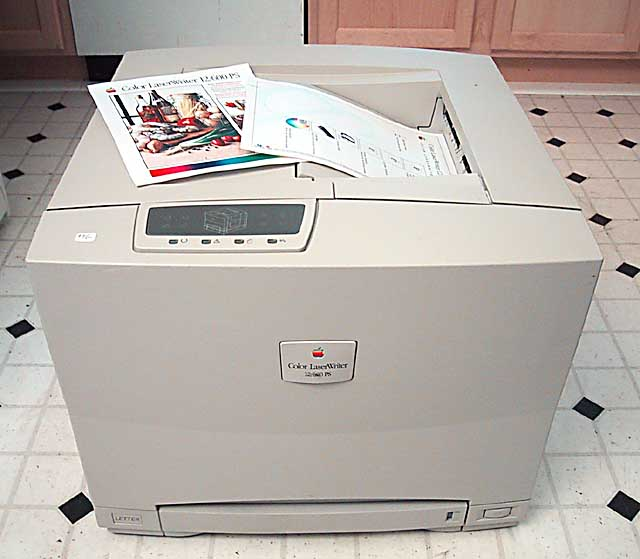
- Introduced: October 1996
- Type: Laser
- Processor: AMD 29030
- Frequency: 30 MHz
- Memory: 16 MB–40 MB
- Slots: 2
- Read-only memory: 4 MB
- Ports: Serial, Parallel, SCSI, LocalTalk, Ethernet
- Power consumption: 1100 Watts
- Color: 4
- Dots per inch: 600
- Speed: 12 Pages Per Minute in B&W, 3 Pages Per Minute in color
- Language: PostScript Level 2
- Weight: 110 lbs
- Dimensions: (H x W x D) 18 x 21 x 23 in

The Color LaserWriter 12/660 PS is a color laser printer introduced by Apple in October 1996. The printer became a workhorse used in Kinko's copy stores across the United States. The printer's weight, size, speed of printing, and high cost of purchase, operation, and maintenance were its chief drawbacks.
