= Thermal-transfer printing =

Digital printing method

Thermal-transfer printing

Thermal-transfer printing is a digital printing method in which material is applied to paper (or some other material) by melting a ribbon coating so it stays glued to the material on which the print is applied. It contrasts with direct thermal printing, where no ribbon is present in the process.

Thermal transfer is preferred over direct thermal printing on surfaces that are heat-sensitive or when higher durability of printed matter (especially against heat) is desired. Thermal transfer is a popular print process particularly used for the printing of identification labels. It is the most widely used printing process in the world for the printing of high-quality barcodes. Printers like label makers can laminate the print for added durability.

Thermal transfer printing was invented by SATO corporation. The world's first thermal-transfer label printer SATO M-2311 was produced in 1981.

== Thermal-transfer printing process ==
Thermal-transfer printing is done by melting wax within the print heads of a specialized printer. The thermal-transfer print process utilises three main components: a non-movable print head, a carbon ribbon (the ink) and a substrate to be printed, which would typically be paper, synthetics, card or textile materials. These three components effectively form a sandwich with the ribbon in the middle. A thermally compliant print head, in combination with the electrical properties of the ribbon and the correct rheological properties of the ribbon ink are all essential in producing a high-quality printed image.

Print heads are available in 203 dpi, 300 dpi and 600 dpi resolution options. Each dot is addressed independently, and when a dot is electronically addressed, it immediately heats up to a pre-set (adjustable) temperature. The heated element immediately melts the wax- or resin-based ink on the side of the ribbon film facing the substrate, and this process, in combination with the constant pressure being applied by the print-head locking mechanism immediately transfers it onto the substrate. When a dot "turns off", that element of the print head immediately cools down, and that part of the ribbon thereby stops melting/printing. As the substrate comes out of the printer, it is completely dry and can be used immediately.

Carbon ribbons are on rolls and are fitted onto a spindle or reel holder within the printer. The used ribbon is rewound by a take-up spindle, forming a roll of "used" ribbon. It is termed a "one-trip" ribbon because once it has been rewound, the used roll is discarded and replaced with a new one. If one were to hold a strip of used carbon ribbon up to the light, one would see an exact negative of the images that have been printed. The main benefit of using a one-trip thermal transfer ribbon is that providing the correct settings are applied prior to printing, a 100% density of printed image is guaranteed, in contrast to a pre-inked ribbon on a dot-matrix impact printer ribbon, which gradually fades with usage.

== Variants ==
=== Color thermal printers ===
Thermal-printing technology can be used to produce color images by adhering a wax-based ink onto paper. As the paper and ribbon travel in unison beneath the thermal print head, the wax-based ink from the transfer ribbon melts onto the paper. When cooled, the wax is permanently adhered to the paper. This type of thermal printer uses a like-sized panel of ribbon for each page to be printed, regardless of the contents of the page. Monochrome printers have a black panel for each page to be printed, while color printers have either three (CMY) or four (CMYK) colored panels for each page. Unlike dye-sublimation printers, these printers cannot vary the dot intensity, which means that images must be dithered. Although acceptable in quality, the printouts from these printers cannot compare with modern inkjet printers and color laser printers. Currently, this type of printer is rarely used for full-page printing, but is now employed for industrial label printing due to its waterfastness and speed. These printers are considered highly reliable due to their small number of moving parts. Printouts from color thermal printers using wax are sensitive to abrasion, as the wax ink can be scraped, rubbed off, or smeared. However, wax-resin compounds and full resins can be used on materials such as polypropylene or polyester in order to increase durability.

=== Tektronix/Xerox solid-ink printers ===
So-called "solid ink" or "phaser" printers were developed by Tektronix and later by Xerox (who acquired Tektronix's printer division). Printers like the Xerox Phaser 8400 use 1 cubic inch (16 cm^{3}) rectangular solid-state ink blocks (similar in consistency to candle wax), which are loaded into a system similar to a stapler magazine in the top of the printer. The ink blocks are melted, and the ink is transferred onto a rotating oil-coated print drum using a piezo inkjet head. The paper then passes over the print drum, at which time the image is transferred, or transfixed, to the page. This system is similar to water-based inkjets, provided that the ink has low viscosity at the jetting temperature 60 °C (140 °F). Printout properties are similar to those mentioned above, although these printers can be configured to produce extremely high-quality results and are far more economical, as they only use the ink needed for the printout, rather than an entire ribbon panel. Costs of upkeep and ink are comparable to color laser printers, while "standby" power usage can be very high, about 200 W.

=== ALPS MicroDry printers ===
MicroDry is a computer printing system developed by the Alps Electric of Japan. It is a wax/resin-transfer system using individual colored thermal ribbon cartridges and can print in process color using cyan, magenta, yellow, and black cartridges, as well as such spot-color cartridges as white, metallic silver, and metallic gold, on a wide variety of paper and transparency stock. Certain MicroDry printers can also operate in dye-sublimation mode, using special cartridges and paper.

== Uses ==
Usage of TT printers in industry includes:

- Barcode labels (as labels printed with a thermal printer tend not to last long) and marking of clothing labels (shirt size etc.).
- Label printers with plastic, paper, and metal label materials.

Barcode printers typically come in fixed sizes of 4, 6 or 8 inches (100, 150 or 200 mm) wide. Although a number of manufacturers have made differing sizes in the past, most have now standardised on these sizes. The main application of these printers is to produce barcode labels for product and shipping identification.
