= HP DeskJet =

Brand of inkjet printers by HP

Logo used since 2015.

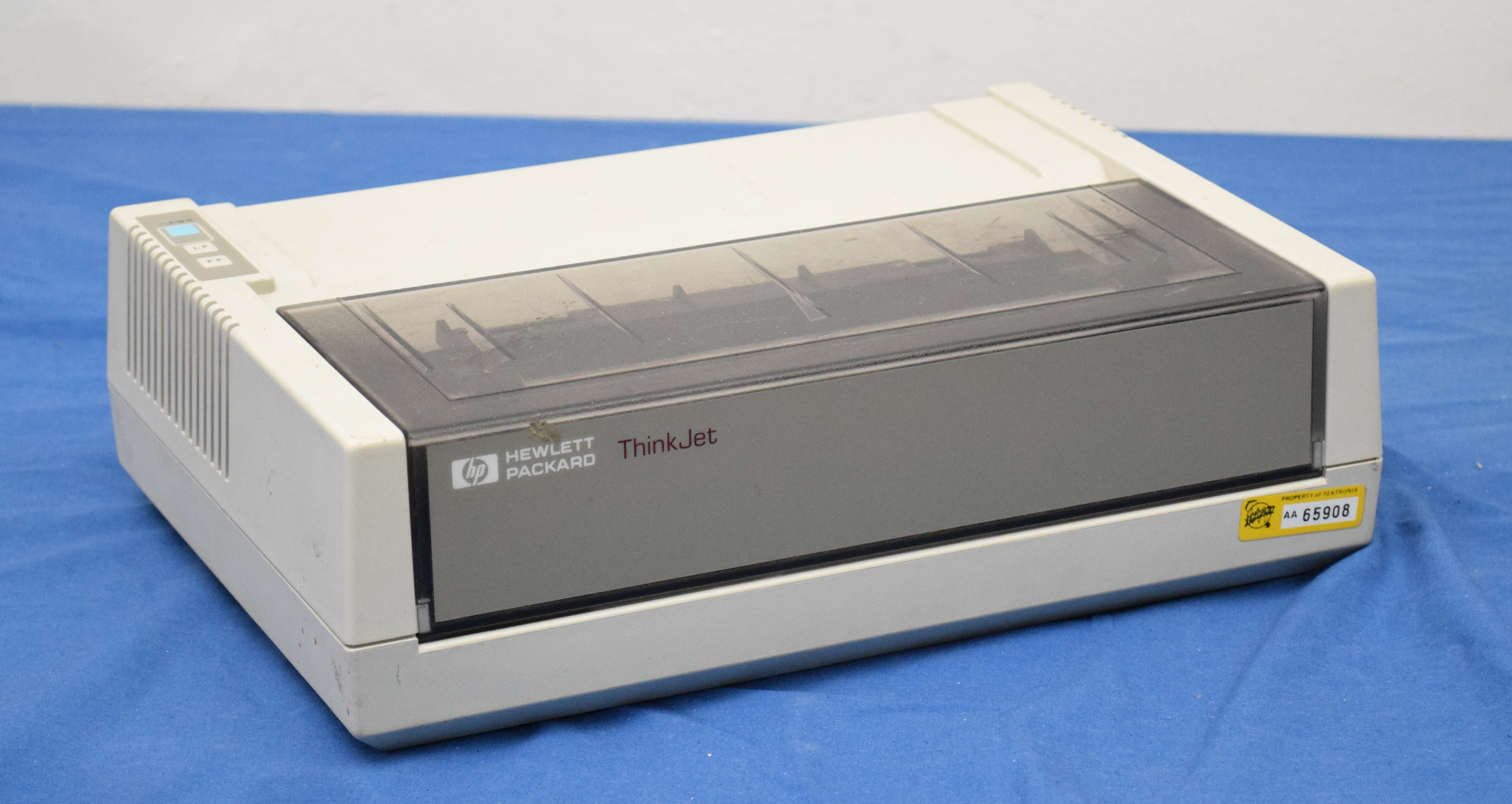
HP's first inkjet printer is the ThinkJet 2225.

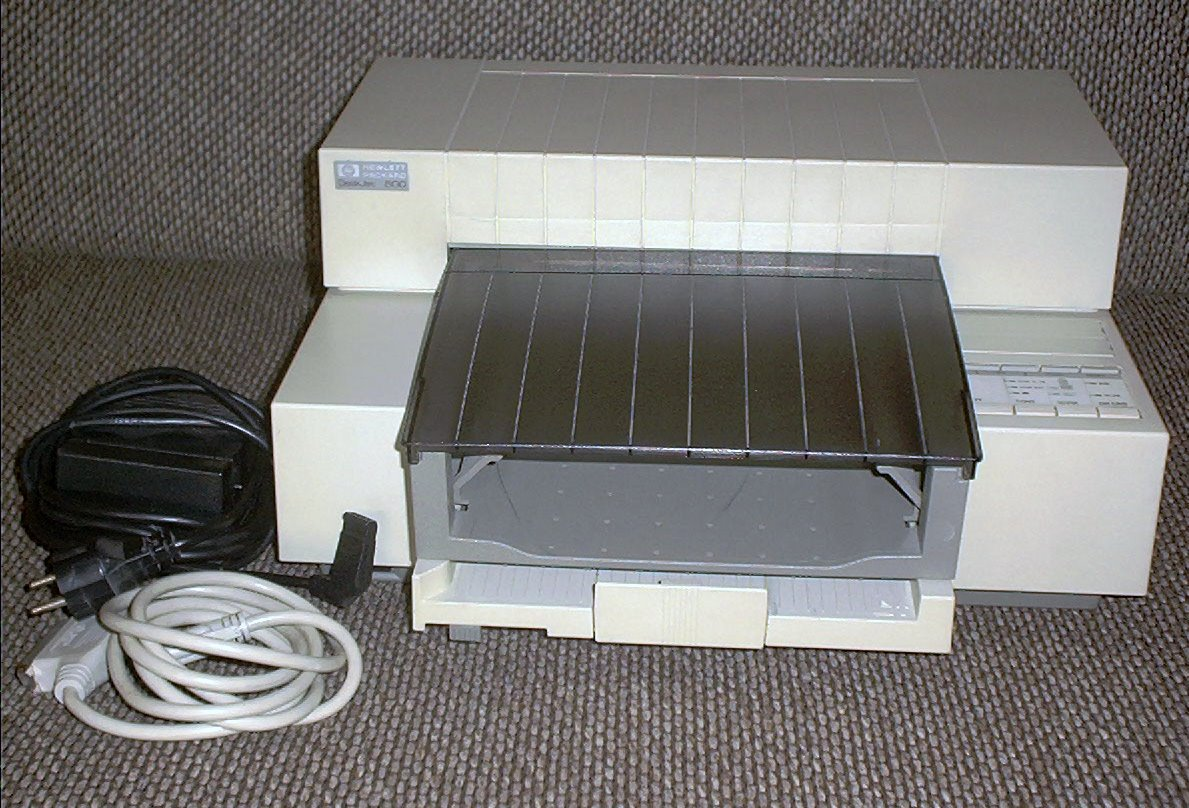
Original DeskJet 500

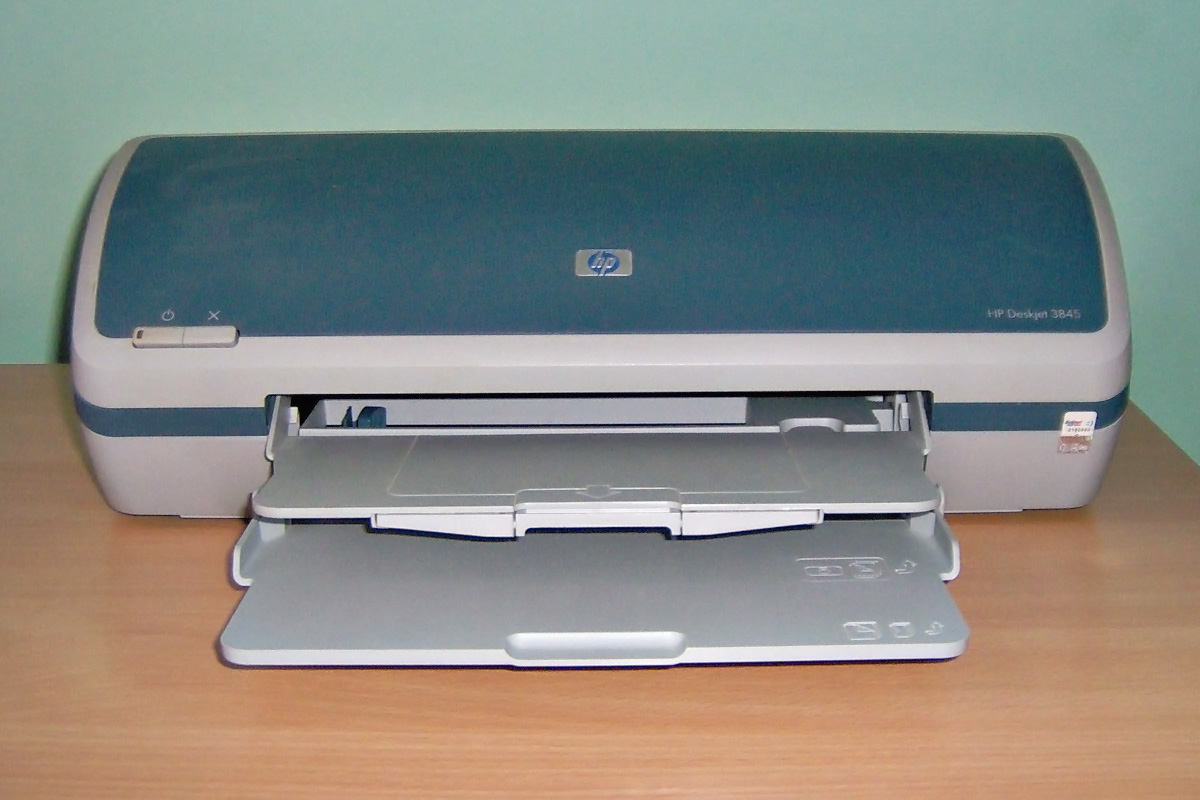
DeskJet 3845

A modern HP DeskJet 2630 all in one printer

DeskJet is a brand name for inkjet printers manufactured by Hewlett-Packard. These printers range from small domestic to large industrial models, although the largest models in the range have generally been dubbed DesignJet. The Macintosh-compatible equivalent was branded as the Deskwriter and competed with Apple's StyleWriter, and the all-in-one equivalent is called OfficeJet.

== History ==
HP began making inkjet printers with the HP ThinkJet (an abbreviation of Thermal Ink Jet) in 1984. It represented the commercial birth of inkjet printing technology. The resolution was about 192 × 96 dpi, printing 150 characters per second (cps).The printer's key benefit was its quiet operation. The HP Integral PC incorporated an ThinkJet. The ThinkJet was the smallest printer produced by HP until 1992 and the first HP printer to carry the "Jet" name, adopted by other printers such as QuietJet, PaintJet, DeskJet, LaserJet or OfficeJet, but also for image scanners as used for ScanJet or JetDirect a line of external print servers. There were five models of the ThinkJet:

HP ThinkJet overview
Model	Interface	Power supply	Weight
HP 2225A	HP-IB	AC line power	7.4 lb (3.4 kg)
HP 2225B	HP-IL	DC battery power	5.5 lb (2.5 kg)
HP 2225C	Parallel port	AC line power	6.8 lb (3.1 kg)
HP 2225D	RS-232C	AC line power	4.6 lb (2.1 kg)
HP 2225P	Parallel port	DC battery power	7.8 lb (3.5 kg)

In 1986, the ThinkJet was followed by the QuietJet (HP 2227A), which were little faster than the ThinkJet and offered slightly better print quality and by the wide-carriage version QuietJet Plus (HP 2228A).

In 1988, HP introduced the first DeskJet. It included a built-in cut sheet feeder, 2 pages per minute (ppm), and 300 dpi. This was followed by the DeskJet Plus in 1989. It offered a landscape printing ability. The DeskJet 500 was introduced in 1990, offering a faster printing speed of 3 ppm. Meanwhile, HP introduced the DeskWriter for the Macintosh in 1989, based on the DeskJet 500.

By 1987, the world's first full-color inkjet printer, the PaintJet, was introduced. It was so successful that HP introduced a version of the DeskJet capable of color printing, the DeskJet 500C, in October 1991, which is also HP's first 300 dpi color printer, offering 4 minutes per page in color, using a swappable either black or CMY print head ink cartridge. It was replaced by the DeskJet 550C in October 1992, HP's first dual-cartridge color DeskJet, offering a real black instead of mixed black ink in color prints, using both the 500C's cartridges at once. The DeskJet 560C followed in March 1994, which introduced HP ColorSmart to intelligently analyze documents for the best color output.

Meanwhile, HP introduced the DeskJet Portable (3 ppm) in 1992. It was designed to be easily portable. It was targeted at mobile professionals. It was replaced by the HP DeskJet 310 (4 ppm B&W, 4 minutes per page color) in 1993, the HP DeskJet 320 in 1994, the HP DeskJet 340 (2 minutes per page color) in 1995, and the HP DeskJet 350 and 350CBi (5 ppm B&W, 2 ppm color) in 2000.

HP continued to make black-and-white-only inkjet printers with the HP DeskJet 510 (1992) and 520 (1994). The HP DeskJet 520 introduced resolution enhancement technology, or REt, to HP inkjet printers. It was also HP's last black-and-white-only inkjet printer. The HP DeskJet 500, 510, 520, 500C, 550C, and 560C were all replaced by the HP DeskJet 540 (3 ppm B&W, 1.5 minutes per page color). A one-pen inkjet printer, color was optional. Also it introduced a different industrial design.

HP's high-end printer line started with the HP DeskJet 1200C, introduced in 1993, offering 6 ppm B&W, and 1 ppm color. This was replaced by the HP DeskJet 1600C (1995), offering 9 ppm B&W, and 4 ppm color, which offered a successor, the HP DeskJet 1600CN (1996), the 1600C with built-in networking.

In May 1995, HP unveiled the HP DeskJet and Deskwriter 660C which contained both black and tricolor inket cartridges that provided 600 by 600 dpi B&W at 4 ppm and 600 by 300 dpi color printing, up to 1.5 ppm. The HP DeskJet 850C and 855C were released in September of that year and featured HP's Color Resolution Enhancement technology (C-Ret) capable of the same resolutions of the 660C but with print speeds of 6 ppm B&W and up to 2 ppm color.

HP replaced the PaintJet XL300 and the DeskJet 1600C/1600CN with the HP DeskJet 1000C/1100C/1120C in 1998, HP's first A3 inkjet printers under the DeskJet brand. These printers were replaced by the HP DeskJet 1220C in 2000, offering 12 ppm in B&W, and 10 ppm in color.

HP-branded "Vivera" ink was introduced with the HP DeskJet 6540 starting in 2004, which also offered improved printing speeds of up to 30 ppm in B&W, and 20 ppm in color.

All-in-one inkjet printers from HP under the DeskJet brand have also been produced, starting with the HP DeskJet F380 printer/scanner/copier, introduced in 2006, using HP Vivera ink, which offered print speeds of up to 20 ppm in black-and-white, and 14 ppm in color.

HP continues to sell various printers under the DeskJet moniker. The current line of HP DeskJets include the HP DeskJet 1000/2000/3000/4000. HP DeskJet 1000s usually are print only, whereas the DeskJet 2000/3000/4000 typically offers scanners built in. The 4000 series typically have both ADF (Automatic Document Feeder) scanning and flatbed scanning. Also in HP's offerings of family/home office printers include the ENVY, OfficeJet(Pro), Smart Tank and some LaserJets.

As of 2021 HP sells new ink cartridges for the original ThinkJet 2225 series. Production is likely to continue indefinitely, as they are also compatible with newer industrial printers.

== See also ==
- List of Hewlett-Packard products
