= LaserWriter =

1985 laser printer

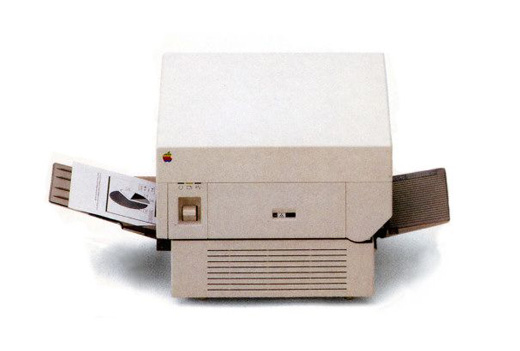
- Introduced: March 1, 1985
- Discontinued: February 1, 1988
- Cost: US$6,995 (equivalent to $20,940 in 2025)
- Type: Laser printer
- Processor: Motorola 68000 @ 11.16 MHz
- Memory: 1.5 MB
- Slots: 1
- Read-only memory: 512 KB
- Ports: Serial, LocalTalk, AppleTalk
- Power consumption: 760 watts
- Color: Monochrome
- Dots per inch: 300
- Speed: 8 pages per minute
- Language: PostScript, Diablo 630
- Weight: 77 lb (35 kg)
- Dimensions: (H × W × D) 11.5 × 18.5 × 16.2 in (29 × 47 × 41 cm)

The LaserWriter is a laser printer with built-in PostScript interpreter sold by Apple, Inc. from 1985 to 1988. It was one of the first laser printers available to the mass market. In combination with WYSIWYG publishing software like PageMaker that operated on top of the graphical user interface of Macintosh computers, the LaserWriter was a key component at the beginning of the desktop publishing revolution.

== History ==
=== Development of laser printing ===
Laser printing traces its history to efforts by Gary Starkweather at Xerox in 1969, which resulted in a commercial system called the Xerox 9700. IBM followed this with the IBM 3800 system in 1976. Both machines were large, room-filling devices handling the combined output of many users. During the mid-1970s, Canon started working on similar machines, and partnered with Hewlett-Packard to produce 1980's HP 2680, which filled only part of a room. Other copier companies also started development of similar systems.

HP introduced their first desktop model, the 2687A with a Ricoh engine for $12,800 in 1983. Sales of the non-networked product were unsurprisingly poor. In 1983, Canon introduced the LBP-CX, a desktop laser printer engine using a laser diode and featuring an output resolution of 300 dpi. In 1984, HP released the first commercially available system based on the LBP-CX, the HP LaserJet.

=== Apple's development ===
By 1982, Apple Computer was rumored to be developing laser printers. Steve Jobs of Apple had seen the LBP-CX while negotiating for supplies of 3.5" floppy disk drives for the upcoming Apple Macintosh computer. Meanwhile, John Warnock had left Xerox to found Adobe Systems to commercialize PostScript and AppleTalk in a laser printer they intended to market. Jobs was aware of Warnock's efforts, and upon his return to California he began convincing Warnock to allow Apple to license PostScript for a new printer that Apple would sell. Negotiations between Apple and Adobe over the use of PostScript began in 1983 and an agreement was reached in December 1983, one month before Macintosh was announced. Jobs eventually arranged for Apple to buy $2.5 million in Adobe stock.

At about the same time, Jonathan Seybold (John W. Seybold's son) introduced Paul Brainerd to Apple, where he learned of Apple's laser printer efforts and saw the potential for a new program using the Mac's GUI to produce PostScript output for the new printer. Arranging his own funding through a venture capital firm, Brainerd formed Aldus and began development of what would become PageMaker. The venture capital coined the term "desktop publishing" during this time.

After hearing of Canon, Apple engineers tried bolting a computer board to a Canon copier. In 1984, the team flew to Japan to ask Canon to manufacture the computer board and commissioned frogdesign for the shell.

=== Release ===
The LaserWriter was announced at Apple's annual shareholder meeting on January 23, 1985, the same day that Aldus announced PageMaker. Shipments began in March 1985 at the retail price of US$6,995, significantly more than the HP model. However, the LaserWriter featured AppleTalk support that allowed the printer to be shared among as many as sixteen Macs, meaning that its per-user price could fall to under $450, far less expensive than HP's less-advanced model.

The combination of the LaserWriter, PostScript, PageMaker and the Mac's GUI and built-in AppleTalk networking would ultimately transform the landscape of computer desktop publishing. At the time, Apple planned to release a suite of AppleTalk products as part of the Macintosh Office, with the LaserWriter being only the first component.

While competing printers and their associated control languages offered some of the capabilities of PostScript, they were limited in their ability to reproduce free-form layouts (as a desktop publishing application might produce), use outline fonts, or offer the level of detail and control over the page layout. HP's own LaserJet was driven by a simple page description language, known as Printer Command Language, or PCL. The version for the LaserJet, PCL3, was extended from the previous laser printers. It lacked the power and flexibility of PostScript until several upgrades provided some level of parity. It was some time before similar products became available on other platforms, by which time the Mac had ridden the desktop publishing market to success.

The LaserWriter included four built-in PostScript font families: Courier, Helvetica, Symbol, and Times. As a result, these fonts became widely used in desktop publishing.

== Description ==
=== Hardware ===
The LaserWriter used the same Canon CX printing engine as the HP LaserJet, and as a consequence early LaserWriters and LaserJets shared the same toner cartridges and paper trays. PostScript is a complete programming language that has to be run in a suitable interpreter and then sent to a software rasterizer program, all inside the printer. To support this, the LaserWriter featured a Motorola 68000 CPU running at 11.16 MHz, 512 KB of workspace RAM, and a 1 MB frame buffer.

At introduction, the LaserWriter had the most processing power in Apple's product line—more than the 8 MHz Macintosh. As a result, the LaserWriter was also one of Apple's most expensive offerings. For implementation purposes, the LaserWriter employed a small number of medium-scale-integration Monolithic Memories PALs, and no custom LSI, whereas the LaserJet employed a large number of small-scale-integration Texas Instruments 74-Series gates, and one custom LSI. The LaserWriter was, thereby, in the same form factor (for its RIP), able to provide much greater function, and, indeed, much greater performance, all within the very same LBP-CX form factor, although the external packaging was, for marketing purposes, somewhat different.

Apple later introduced the LaserWriter Plus, which doubled the printer's ROM capacity from 512 KB to 1 MB and increased its built-in font selection from four to eleven, adding Avant Garde, Bookman, Helvetica Narrow, New Century Schoolbook, Palatino, Zapf Chancery, and Zapf Dingbats.

=== Networking ===
Since the cost of a LaserWriter was several times that of a dot-matrix impact printer, some means to share the printer with several Macs was desired. LANs were complex and expensive, so Apple developed its own networking scheme, LocalTalk. Based on the AppleTalk protocol stack, LocalTalk connected the LaserWriter to the Mac over an RS-422 serial port. At 230.4 kbit/s LocalTalk was slower than the Centronics PC parallel interface, but allowed several computers to share a single LaserWriter. PostScript enabled the LaserWriter to print complex pages containing high-resolution bitmap graphics, outline fonts, and vector illustrations. The LaserWriter could print more complex layouts than the HP LaserJet and other non-Postscript printers. Paired with the program Aldus PageMaker, the LaserWriter gave the layout editor an exact replica of the printed page. The LaserWriter offered a generally faithful proofing tool for preparing documents for quantity publication, and could print smaller quantities directly. The Mac platform quickly gained the favor of the emerging desktop-publishing industry, a market in which the Mac is still important.

=== Design ===
The LaserWriter was the first major printer designed by Apple to use the new Snow White design language created by Frog Design. It also continued a departure from the beige color that characterized the Apple and Macintosh products to that time by using the same brighter, creamy off-white color first introduced with the Apple IIc and Apple Scribe Printer 8 months earlier. In that regard it and its successors stood out among all of Apple's Macintosh product offerings until 1987, when Apple adopted a unifying warm gray color they called Platinum across its entire product line, which was to last for over a decade.

The LaserWriter was also the first peripheral to use the LocalTalk connector and Apple's unified round AppleTalk Connector Family, which allowed any variety of mechanical networking systems to be plugged into the ports on the computers or printers. A common solution was the 3rd party PhoneNET which used conventional telephone cables for networking.

=== Legacy ===
Apple's RIP was of its own design, and was implemented using few ICs, including PALs for most combinatorial logic; with the subsystem timing DRAM refreshing, and rasterization functions being implemented in very few medium-scale-integration PALs. Apple's competitors (i.e., QMS, NEC, and others) generally used a variation of one of Adobe's RIPs with their large quantity of small-scale-integration (i.e., Texas Instruments' 7400 series) ICs.

In the same time-frame as Apple's LaserWriter, Adobe was licensing the very same version of PostScript to Apple's potential competitors (Apple's PostScript licensing terms were non-exclusive); however, all non-Apple licensees of PostScript generally employed one of Adobe's PostScript "reference models" (Atlas, Redstone, etc.) and even Linotype's first image setter which featured PostScript employed such a "reference model" (but with customization for the Linotronic's different video interface, plus the necessary implementation of "banding" and a hard drive frame buffer and font storage mechanism). Indeed, the PostScript language itself was concurrently enhanced and extended to support these high-resolution "banding" devices (as contrasted to the lower resolution "framing" devices, such as the LaserWriter, in which the entire "frame" could be contained within the available RAM).

In most cases, such RAM was fixed in size and was soldered to the logic board. In late PostScript Level 1, and in early PostScript Level 2, the RAM size was made variable and was generally extensible, through plug-in SIMMs, beyond the 2.0 to 2.5 MB minimum (0.5 to 1.0 MB for instructions, depending upon PostScript version, and 1.5 MB minimum for the "frame buffer", for the lowest resolution devices, 300 dpi), as more than 300 dpi of course required more RAM, and some LaserWriters were able to change between 300 dpi and 600 dpi, depending upon how much RAM was installed. 600 dpi, for example, required 6 MB of RAM, but 8 MB of RAM was more commonly found.

At this point, Apple's LaserWriters were employing generic non-parity RAM, whereas HP's LaserJets, especially the ones which offered a plug-in PostScript interpreter card, required special parity-type PS/2 RAM modules with a "presence detect" function according to IBM specs.

== Other LaserWriter models ==
Building on the success of the original LaserWriter, Apple developed many further models. Later LaserWriters offered faster printing, higher resolutions, Ethernet connectivity, and eventually color output in the Color LaserWriter. To compete, many other laser printer manufacturers licensed Adobe PostScript for inclusion into their own models. Eventually the standardization on Ethernet for connectivity and the ubiquity of PostScript undermined the unique position of Apple's printers: Macintosh computers functioned equally well with any Postscript printer. After the LaserWriter 8500, Apple discontinued the LaserWriter product line in 1997 when Steve Jobs returned to Apple.

=== LaserWriter II ===
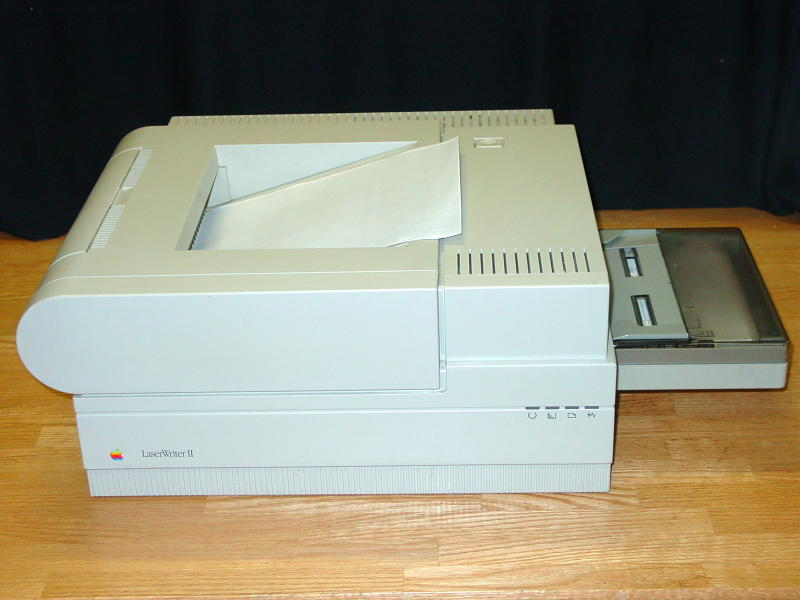
Apple LaserWriter II

In 1988, to address the need for both an affordable printer and a professional printer, the LaserWriter II was designed to allow for complete replacement of the circuit board that operates the printer. Across all the different models, the print engine was the same.

- For low-end users, there was the LaserWriter IISC, a host-based QuickDraw printer connected via SCSI that did not use PostScript and did not require a license from Adobe. It had two SCSI ports to allow daisy-chaining of the printer with other SCSI devices such as hard drives. It did not support AppleTalk.
- For mid-range users, the LaserWriter IINT provided PostScript support and AppleTalk networking.
- For high-end users, the LaserWriter IINTX also included a SCSI controller for storage of printer fonts on a hard drive dedicated for use by the printer.

Three years later, in 1991, two updated versions of the LaserWriter II were produced.

- The LaserWriter IIf had a faster processor than the IINTX, a newer version of PostScript and also HP PCL, and included the SCSI interface for font storage on an external hard drive.
- The LaserWriter IIg had the capabilities of the IIf, and was also the first LaserWriter with a built-in Ethernet network interface.

To deliver higher performance, Apple eventually switched from the 68000 series to the Am29000 series of processors to drive later models, starting with the Personal LaserWriter NTR in 1992.
