= DayStar Digital =

Computer company

DayStar Digital, Inc.
- Type: Private
- Founded: Georgia (May, 1983)
- Defunct: July, 1999
- Headquarters: Flowery Branch, Georgia, United States
- Key people: Andrew F. Lewis, Founder/CEO (see list below)
- Products: FastCache, PowerCache, Turbo 040, Power 601, Genesis MP
- Number of employees: 175
- Website: daystar.com at the Wayback Machine (archived 1997-06-24)

DayStar Digital, Inc., was a technology company founded in 1983 by Andrew Lewis. The company was started as a subcontract manufacturer of electronic assemblies and circuit boards. In 1986, the company released memory upgrades for Apple Macintosh (Mac) computers as its first products, and in 1987, DayStar began to market processor upgrades exclusively for the Mac, the first being for the Macintosh II computer.

The company focused exclusively on this market for the full range of Mac computers through 1995, utilizing the Motorola 68030, 68040 and PowerPC 601 processors. These upgrades were installed directly into the Processor Direct Slot of various Macintosh platforms, as on the Macintosh IIci, or via an adapter. DayStar became known as the leading "speed shop" for Macintosh computer systems; it won virtually every Mac editorial award given for product excellence and had the top rated brand among peripheral manufacturers.

The company also formed unique strategic relationships with many companies including Apple, IBM and Adobe. In 1995, DayStar was one of three companies in the world awarded licenses by Apple to "clone" the Macintosh computer.

== Cache and Processor Upgrades ==
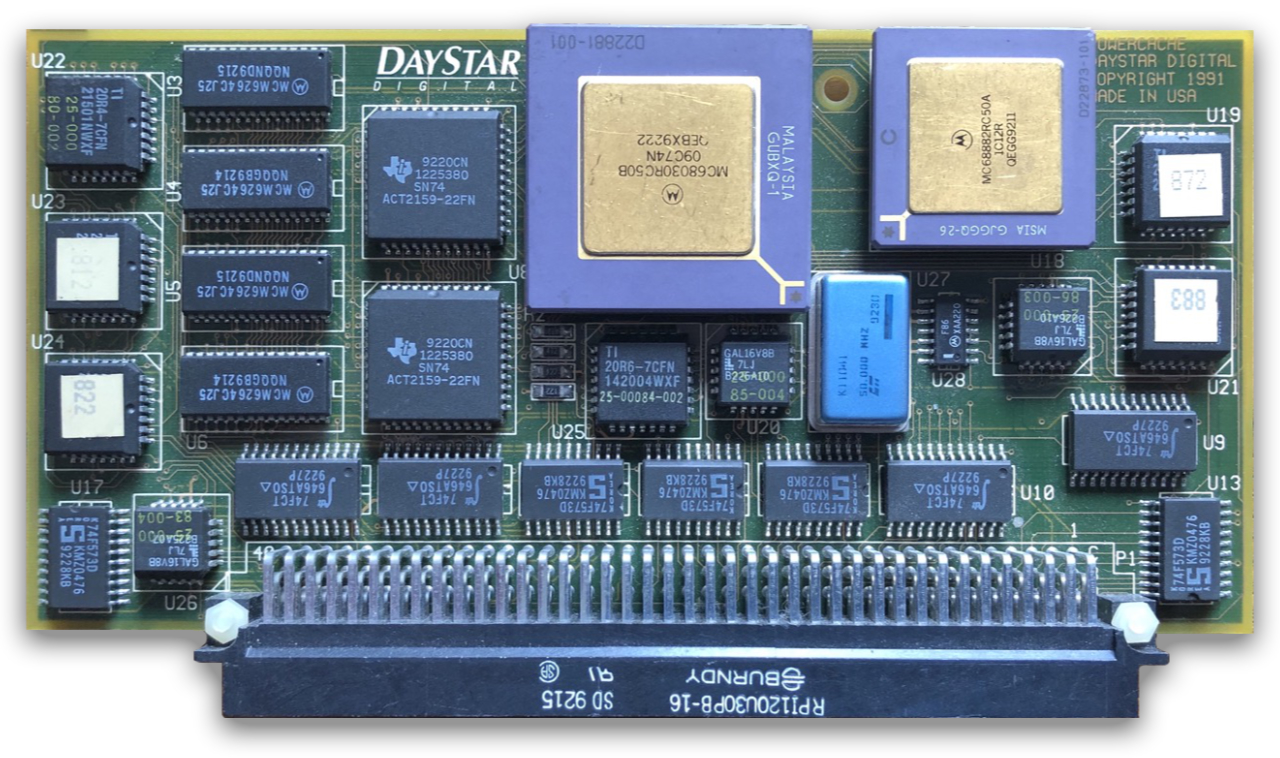
DayStar PowerCache with a 50 MHz 68030 and 68882

=== FastCache ===
DayStar introduced their FastCache IIci in conjunction with the release of Apple's Macintosh IIci in 1989. It plugged into the Processor Direct Slot and provided 64 KB of Level 2 cache for the IIci's CPU - double what was offered by Apple's own cache card. An additional FastCache IIsi was offered for the Macintosh IIsi in 1991.

=== PowerCache ===
The DayStar PowerCache was a Motorola 68030 processor card running at either 33, 40 or 50 MHz, with an optional 68882 math co-processor. The PowerCache plugged directly into the Processor Direct Slot of the Mac IIci, while in the case of the Mac II, IIx or IIcx, a PDS slot was provided via an adapter that plugged into the CPU socket. The Mac IIsi, LC, or SE/30 could also use the PowerCache with a PDS adapter. In addition to the CPU and (optional) FPU, the PowerCache had 32 KB of Level 2 cache.

=== Turbo 040 ===
The Turbo 040 was DayStar's 68040 based processor card running at 33 or 40 MHz. The 33 MHz version could be fitted with either a full 68040 or the lower cost 68LC040, which lacked an FPU. Both versions came with 128 KB of Level 2 cache. With the exception of the LC, the Turbo 040 was compatible with the same machines as the PowerCache and additionally the IIvx and IIvi / Performa 600.

=== Power 601 ===
The DayStar Power 601 was an upgrade card fitted with either a 66 or 100 MHz PowerPC 601 and 256 KB of Level 2 cache. The Power 601 gave owners of a few 68030 based Macs an upgrade path to the new PowerPC architecture, using the Processor Direct Slot of the IIci, IIvx and IIvi / Performa 600.

== High-performance Macintosh clones ==
In 1995, the company engaged with Apple in co-development of the first dual processor system, sold only as an upgrade by DayStar. Then, in 1995, DayStar received a license from Apple to produce Macintosh clones and the industry's only multi-processor Apple systems, notably the DayStar Genesis MP dual and quad processor systems built around the PowerPC 604 chips. In retrospect, the Genesis MP is considered one of the most influential Macs of 1995, and one of the 25 most influential Macs for the first 25 years of the Mac product line. The license for all clone manufacturers was for version 7 of the operating system, but when Apple did not extend the license to version 8, it effectively canceled the program for all the clone companies. DayStar Digital eventually dissolved as a company in July, 1999.

Key people behind the marketing and technological success of the company include (and in no particular order): Marketing: Gary Dailey, David Methven, Ted Cheney, Jerry DeAvila; Engineering: Bob Hudson, Larry Knight, Irvan Krantzler, Rod Frazer, Henry Kannapell, Chris Cooksey.

== Bibliography ==
- Andrew Lewis, personal memoirs, 1993, 2000.
- Snell, Jason (May 29, 2025). "30 years ago, Apple fans met the Mac clone. This is the weird, wild story". Macworld.
