= Macintosh IIfx =

Personal computer by Apple

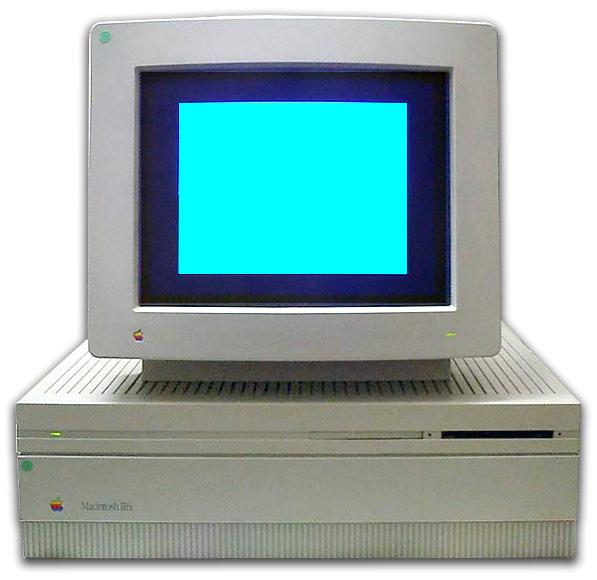
- Developer: Apple Computer
- Product family: Macintosh II
- Released: March 19, 1990
- Introductory price: US$8,969 (equivalent to $22,103 in 2025)
- Discontinued: April 15, 1992
- Operating system: System 6.0.5 – 7.6.1; A/UX 2.0 – 3.1.1
- CPU: Motorola 68030 @ 40 MHz
- Memory: 4 MB, expandable to 128 MB (80 ns 64-pin SIMMs)
- Dimensions: Height: 5.5 inches (14 cm); Width: 18.7 inches (47 cm); Depth: 14.4 inches (37 cm)
- Weight: 24 pounds (11 kg)
- Predecessor: Macintosh IIx
- Successor: Macintosh Quadra 900
- Related: Macintosh Classic; Macintosh SE/30; Macintosh IIci; Macintosh IIsi

The Macintosh IIfx is a personal computer designed, manufactured and sold by Apple Computer from March 1990 to April 1992. At introduction it cost from US$9,000 to US$12,000, depending on configuration, and it was the fastest Macintosh available at the time.

The IIfx is the most powerful of the 68030-based Macintosh II family and was replaced at the top of Apple's lineup by the Macintosh Quadra in 1991. It is the last Apple computer released that was designed using the Snow White design language.

== Overview ==
Dubbed "Wicked Fast" by its Product Manager, Frank Casanova – who came to Apple from Apollo Computer in Boston, Massachusetts, where the Boston term "wicked" is commonly used to denote anything extreme – the IIfx runs at a clock rate of 40 megahertz, has 32 KB of Level 2 cache, six NuBus slots, and includes a number of proprietary ASICs and coprocessors. Designed to speed up the machine even further, these chips require system-specific drivers. The 40 MHz speed refers to the main logic board clock (the bus), the Motorola 68030 CPU, and the computer's Motorola 68882 FPU. The machine has eight RAM slots, for a maximum of 128 MB RAM, an enormous amount at the time. The Macintosh IIci, which debuted in 1989, also could support 128 megabytes of RAM.

The IIfx features specialized high-speed (80 ns) RAM using 64-pin dual-ported SIMMs, while all other contemporary Macintosh models use 30-pin SIMMs. The extra pins are a separate path to allow latched read and write operations. It is also possible to use parity memory modules; the IIfx is the only stock 68K Macintosh to support them along with special versions of the Macintosh IIci. The logic board has a total of 8 RAM slots; these must be populated four at a time with 1, 4, or 16 MB chips; this results in a maximum memory amount of 128 MB.

The IIfx includes two special dedicated processors for floppy disk operations, sound, ADB, and serial communications. These I/O chips feature a pair of 10 MHz embedded 6502 CPUs, which is the same CPU family used in Apple II machines.

The IIfx uses SCSI as its hard disk interface, as had all previous Macintosh models since the Macintosh Plus. DMA capability was added, improving disk I/O throughput, but is only supported in A/UX and not the Macintosh System Software. The IIfx requires a special black-colored SCSI terminator for external drives.

Industrial Light & Magic upgraded their image processing hardware to the IIfx by the time Terminator 2: Judgment Day entered post-production.

== Models ==
When first introduced, the IIfx was offered in the following configurations:

- Macintosh IIfx: 4 MB memory, 1.44 MB SuperDrive. US$8,969.
- Macintosh IIfx 4/80: 4 MB memory, 80 MB HDD. US$9,869.
- Macintosh IIfx 4/160: 4 MB memory, 160 MB HDD. US$10,969.
- Macintosh IIfx 4/80 with Parity Support: 4 MB of parity error-checking RAM, 80 MB HDD.

Introduced May 15, 1990:

- Macintosh IIfx 4/80 with A/UX: 4 MB memory, 160 MB HDD, A/UX 2.0 preinstalled. US$10,469. Shipments began in June.

== Timeline ==
Timeline of Macintosh II family models
