= System 6 =

1988 operating system version

- Version of the classic Mac OS operating system
- System 6.0.8
- Developer: Apple Computer
- OS family: Macintosh
- Working state: No longer supported: Can Also be Historical unsupported
- Source model: Closed source
- Released to manufacturing: April 1988; 38 years ago
- Latest release: 6.0.8 / May 1991; 35 years ago
- Kernel type: Monolithic
- License: Proprietary
- Preceded by: System 5
- Succeeded by: System 7

Support status
- Historical, unsupported

System 6 (also known as System Software 6) is the sixth major release of classic Mac OS, Apple Computer's operating system for Macintosh computers. Released in 1988, it is a monolithic operating system that supports cooperative multitasking through an improved version of MultiFinder. The boxed version, sold for updating existing computers, retailed for US$49 (equivalent to about $130 in 2025). System 6 was included with new Macintosh computers until 1991, when it was succeeded by System 7.

== Overview ==
=== MacroMaker ===
The MacroMaker utility was introduced in System 6. It records mouse and keyboard input as macros, and has a unique user interface intended to look and act like a tape recorder. MacroMaker was criticized for its lack of features when compared to Microsoft's AutoMac III, which was already available commercially. As MacroMaker records only the locations of mouse-clicks inside windows and not what is being clicked on or exactly when, it can not be used to automate actions in more sophisticated programs. The pre-recorded clicks miss buttons if the buttons had moved since the recording, or if they failed to appear upon playback. It records the start and end locations of mouse movements, but does not track the precise path of a movement or support pauses. MacroMaker is not compatible with System 7, in which it is succeeded by AppleScript.

=== Multitasking ===
Macintosh gained cooperative multitasking in March 1985 with Andy Hertzfeld's Switcher, which can switch between multiple full-screen applications. It was not integrated, and was only sold separately by Apple. Not many programs and features function correctly with Switcher, and it does not share the screen between applications simultaneously. Systems 5 and 6 have MultiFinder instead, which is much more mature and widely used in System 6. With MultiFinder, the Finder does not quit to free resources, and the system behaves as in the still-familiar multitasking fashion, with the desktop and other applications' windows in the background.

=== Hardware support ===
System 6 includes support for the Apple ImageWriter LQ and PostScript laser printers. New software drivers allow the ImageWriter LQ to be used on AppleTalk local area networks and supports the use of tabloid or B-size paper (11 in × 17 in or 280 mm × 430 mm). System 6 includes QuickerGraf (originally QuickerDraw), system software used to accelerate the drawing of color images on the Macintosh II. It was licensed to Apple and Radius Inc. by its programmer, Andy Hertzfeld.

=== Limitations ===
In comparison to the NeXTSTEP operating system of the time, System 6 does not make much use of sound, and its user interface is limited in file management and window displays. System 6's Apple menu cannot be used to launch applications. The icon in the upper right-hand corner of the menu bar simply shows the open application and is not a menu. System 6 supports 24 bits of addressable RAM (random-access memory), which allows for a maximum of 8 megabytes of RAM, with no provision for virtual memory. These limitations were removed in System 7. System 6's version of the HFS file system also has a volume size limit; it supports up to 2 gigabytes (GB) and 65,536 files on any one volume. System 7.5 increased this limit to 4 GB, and 7.5.2 increased it further to 2 TB on certain machines, specifically PCI-based Macintosh models.

The Trash (known as the "Wastebasket" in the British-English version) empties when the Finder terminates. Icons on the Desktop in System 6 are not organized into a single folder, as in later operating systems. Instead, the system records if a file is on the Desktop. This is inefficient and confusing, as the user cannot browse to the Desktop in applications besides the Finder, even within the standard Open and Save As dialog boxes. Furthermore, these dialogs are primitive, and were mostly unchanged since 1984. The lack of aliases, shortcuts to files, is another limitation of file management on System 6, and custom file and folder icons are not supported. These issues were all remedied in System 7.

A maximum of 15 desk accessories may be installed at one time, including the Chooser, Scrapbook, and Control Panel. System 6 uses the Control Panel desk accessory to access all the installed control panels, which imposes severe user-interface limitations. In System 7, Control Panels are contained in separately openable panels, and are held in a central folder for better organization. Desk Accessories cannot be installed or removed within the Finder; this requires the Font/DA Mover utility. System 7 also fixed this.

The interface offers limited customization. The Finder allows users to assign each icon a color, but, like System 5, desktop background is restricted to tiled 8 × 8-pixel color patterns, and standard window frames are monochrome. These issues were addressed in System 7. Third-party "INIT" extensions provided additional color and customization options. By 1989, BYTE magazine described the System 6 interface as needing an update.

== Reception ==
Initial releases of System 6 are unstable; Don Crabb of BYTE described 6.0 as "buggy and unreliable". Many third-party developers did not receive advance copies, resulting in widespread compatibility issues. The contemporary versions of many common programs such as Microsoft Excel, Microsoft Works and 4th Dimension were not fully compatible with System 6. There were also software bugs in the Color Manager, Script Manager, and Sound Manager extension files. Apple announced that 66 bugs were fixed with version 6.0.1 update, in September 1988. However, a major bug involving the text-spacing of screen fonts was found, and was fixed in version 6.0.2, which Crabb described as "a huge improvement" over 6.0. Some customers waited longer until moving to System 6 because of its poor reputation.

== Compatibility ==
System 6 was officially supported by Apple for many different machines, some of which shipped with it. Some unsupported Macintosh computers can run it with limitations.

Model	Release	6.0.8	6.0.7	6.0.5	6.0.4	6.0.3	6.0.2
128K	1984	No	No	No	No	No	No
512K	1984	No	No	No	No	No	No
Macintosh XL	1985	No	No	No	No	No	No
512Ke	1986	Yes	Yes	Yes	Yes	Yes	Yes
Plus	1986	Yes	Yes	Yes	Yes	Yes	Yes
SE	1987	Yes	Yes	Yes	Yes	Yes	Yes
II	1987	Yes	Yes	Yes	Yes	Yes	Yes
IIx	1988	Yes	Yes	Yes	Yes	Yes	Yes
SE/30	1989	Yes	Yes	Yes	No	Yes	Yes
Portable	1989	Yes	Yes	Yes	Yes	Yes	Yes
Classic	1989	Yes	Yes	Yes	Yes	Yes	No
Classic II	1989	Yes: 6.0.8L	No	No	No	No	No
IIcx	1989	Yes	Yes	Yes	Yes	Yes	No
IIci	1989	Yes	Yes	Yes	Yes	No	No
IIfx	1990	Yes	Yes	Yes	No	No	No
IIsi	1990	Yes	Yes	No	No	No	No
LC	1990	Yes	Yes	No	No	No	No
Quadra 700	1991	No	No	No	No	No	No
PowerBook 100	1991	Yes: 6.0.8L	No	No	No	No	No
PowerBook 140/170	1991	No	No	No	No	No	No
LC II	1992	Yes: 6.0.8L	No	No	No	No	No

== Version history ==
System version	Release	Software versions			Information
System version	Release	Finder	MultiFinder	LaserWriter	Information
6.0	June 10, 1988	6.1	6.0	5.2	Initial release.
6.0.1	September 19, 1988	6.1.1	6.0.1	5.2	Release for Macintosh IIx.
6.0.2	September 19, 1988	6.1	6.0.1	5.2	Maintenance release.
6.0.3	December 23, 1988	6.1	6.0.3	5.2	Maintenance release with bug fixes for Apple File Exchange, Time Manager, and other components. New York 18 and 24 fonts were removed. Macintosh IIcx shipped with this version.
6.0.4	September 20, 1989	6.1.4	6.0.4	5.2	Release for Macintosh Portable and IIci.
6.0.5	March 19, 1990	6.1.5	6.0.5	5.2	Release for Macintosh IIfx.
6.0.6	March 19, 1990	6.1.6	6.0.6	5.2	Release for Macintosh Classic, LC and IIsi; contained bugs with keyboard and AppleTalk.
6.0.7	October 15, 1990	6.1.7	6.0.7	5.2	Maintenance release.
6.0.8	May 13, 1991	6.1.8	6.0.8	7.0	Updated printing software to match System 7.
6.0.8L	March 23, 1992	6.1.8	6.0.8	7.0	"L" indicates that it supported only a limited range of computers. It was released with the Macintosh Classic II and PowerBook 100, and also runs on the Macintosh Classic, Macintosh LC, and Macintosh LC II. Enables network compatibility with System 7.

== Timeline ==
Timeline of Mac operating systems

Preceded by System 5	System 6; 1988	Succeeded by System 7
