= Mac Classic =

Mac Classic may refer to:

- Macintosh Classic, a model of Macintosh computer
- Classic Environment, a compatibility layer for Mac OS 9 included in Mac OS X
- Classic Mac OS, versions of Mac OS before Mac OS X
