= Apple OneScanner =

Series of Apple scanner devices for Macintosh

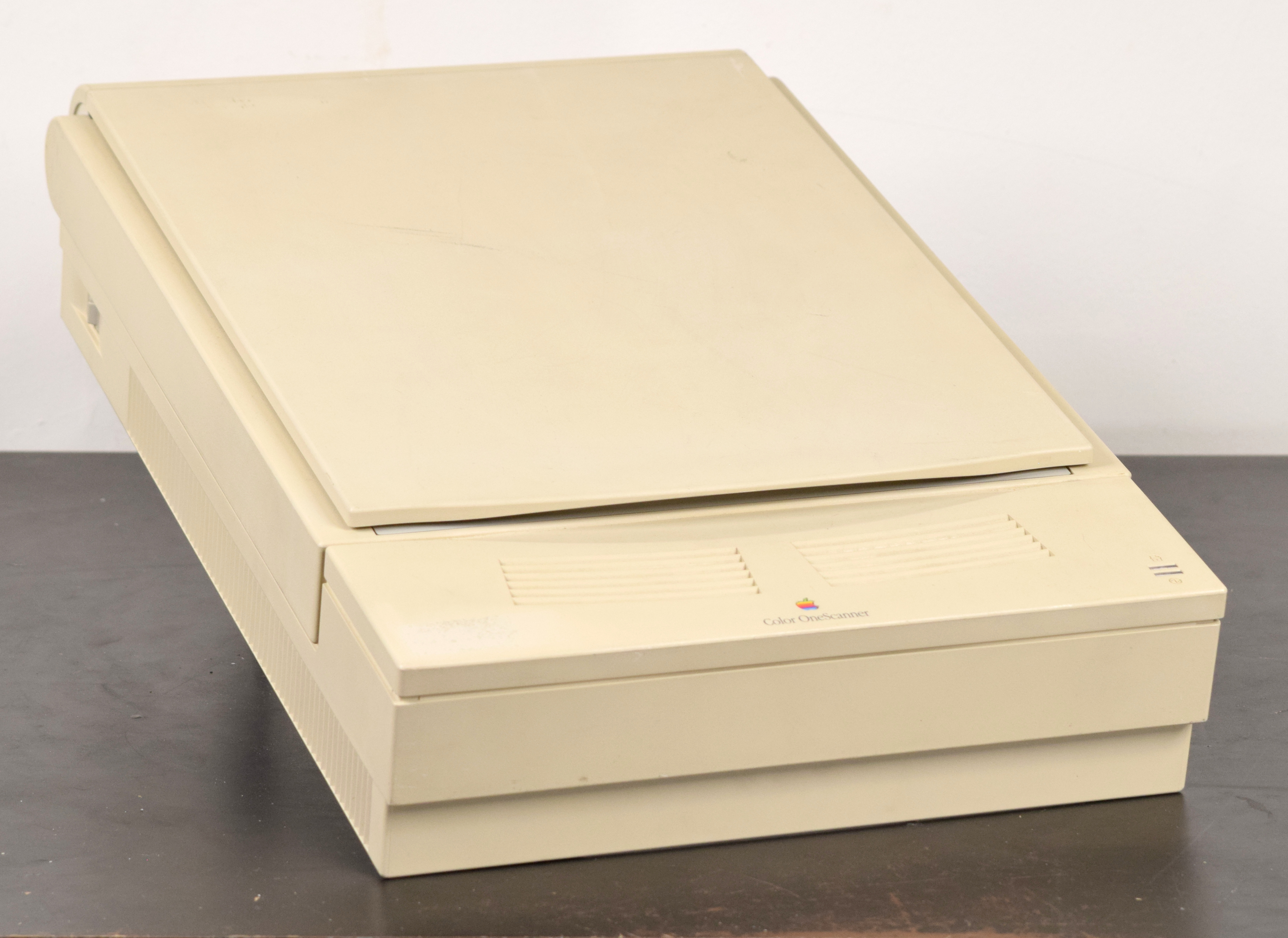
Apple Color OneScanner

The OneScanner was a series of flatbed scanners marketed by Apple Computer during the early 1990s. The original OneScanner model was introduced in 1991 to replace the earlier Apple Scanner, offering 8-bit (256 shades) greyscale scanning. It was joined by the Color OneScanner the next year, and a series of updated models followed. The series culminated with the Color OneScanner 1200/30, with a resolution of 600x1200 dpi and 30-bit color scanning. The 1200/30 included options for automatic page feeding and scanning transparent materials. The entire OneScanner series used SCSI as its primary interface. Sales of the final 1200/30 model ended in 1997.

The scanners were offered with a variety of software. For basic scanning needs, they included Ofoto one-button scanning software, and HyperScan 2.0 for scanning into HyperCard. Later versions shipped with Xerox TextBridge OCR and ColorSync support.

The OneScanner was offered in a version for Windows, with Ofoto 2.0.
