= Processor direct slot =

System expansion slot in early Apple computers

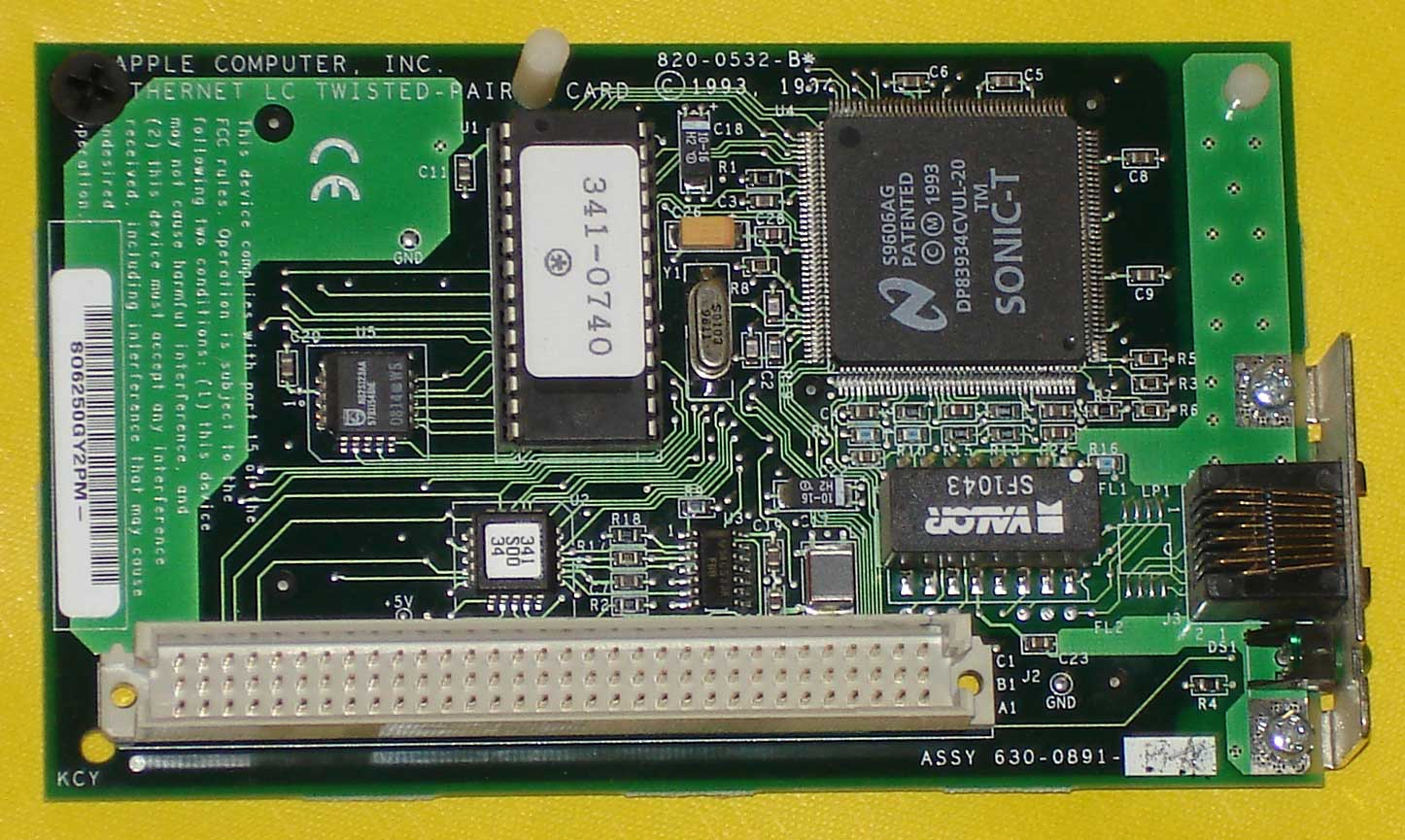
LC PDS Ethernet card. PDS connector is at bottom left of photo. The card was mounted parallel to the main logic board, unlike most computer busses in which cards are inserted at right angles to the motherboard.

A processor direct slot (PDS) is a slot incorporated into many older Macintosh models that allowed direct access to the signal pins of a CPU, similar to the functionality of a local bus in PCs. This would result in much higher speeds than having to go through a bus layer, such as NuBus, which typically ran at a slower 10 MHz speed.

== Overview ==
Typically, if a machine had bus expansion slots it would feature multiple bus expansions slots. However, there was never more than one PDS slot, as rather than providing a sophisticated communication protocol with arbitration between different bits of hardware that might be trying to use the communication channel at the same time, the PDS slot, for the most part, just gave direct access to signal pins on the CPU, making it closer in nature to a local bus.

Thus, PDS slots tended to be CPU-specific, and therefore a card designed for the PDS slot in the Motorola 68030-based Macintosh SE/30, for example, would not work in the Motorola 68040-based Quadra 700.

The one notable exception to this was the PDS design for the original Motorola 68020-based Macintosh LC. This was Apple's first attempt at a "low-cost" Mac, and it was such a success that, when subsequent models replaced the CPU with a 68030, a 68040, and later a PowerPC processor, Apple found methods to keep the PDS slot compatible with the original LC, so that the same expansion cards would continue to work.

== History ==
=== SE slot (Motorola 68000) ===
The SE "System Expansion" slot, introduced in the Macintosh SE in 1987, was the first processor direct slot, using a 96-pin Euro-DIN connector (DIN 41612) to interface with the Motorola 68000 processor. This slot was also used in the Macintosh Portable.

=== IIci cache slot (Motorola 68030) ===
The L2 cache slot of the Macintosh IIci, introduced in 1989, was a 32-bit version of a PDS which used a 120-pin Euro-DIN connector to support the Motorola 68030 processor. This slot also appeared in the IIvi, and IIvx. These allowed for 3rd party companies, such as DayStar Digital, to develop processor upgrades that did not require the removal of the CPU. The IIci cache slot is different from the other PDS slot as it doesn't have provision for external connectors, and it does not include an interrupt request signal, thus limiting its use. Its pin configuration is also completely different from the one in most later MC68030-based non-LC Macintoshes.

=== IIsi, SE/30 slot (Motorola 68030) ===
Micron Xceed PDS video cards for SE/30

The Macintosh SE/30 included a PDS slot that uses the same 120-pin Euro-Din connector as the IIci, but a different pin configuration. The primary clock is the 16 MHz clock for the CPU. Unlike the IIci cache slot, it includes three interrupt request signals. There is also provision in the case for external connectors, so it was commonly used for graphic or network devices. The Macintosh IIsi included a motherboard slot very similar to the SE/30, although clocked at 20 MHz like the onboard MC68030. This slot was not intended for direct use, Apple instead offered two adapter cards with a second connector mounted at a right angle (so the board would be parallel to the motherboard). One card provided a NuBus slot, while the other was essentially a pass-through configuration enabling a slot very similar to the IIsi, but with only one interrupt signal supported. Both cards also included an MC68882 FPU, which was not present on the IIsi motherboard.

=== IIfx PDS (Motorola 68030) ===
The Macintosh IIfx, introduced in 1990, included a PDS that was almost identical to the SE/30 and IIsi, but not entirely. In particular, the clock signal is running at 20 MHz like the IIsi but the CPU is running at 40 MHz. The clock signal is also on a different pin from the IIsi and SE/30. Unlike other PDS, the connections to the processor signals are not direct, with intermediate buffering needed to handle the different clocks based on the physical address requested – some address would be accessed with the 20 MHz clock, and some other with the (not directly available on the slot) 40 MHz CPU clock ("fast slot space"). The physical space available for the board was also different from the SE/30 and IIsi.

=== LC slot (Motorola 68020/68030) ===
The LC slot, introduced in 1990, began as a PDS for the Motorola 68020 / 68030 processors in the Macintosh LC / LC II. It only supported the asynchronous cycle of the MC68020, and did not connect all address signals, though it did connect all 32 data signals. The 96-pin Euro-DIN connector is similar to the SE slot connector, but the two are completely incompatible. Latter models added 18 more pins through a notched in-line extension to support the full MC68030 bus (synchronous cycle, all address lines, clock both from the CPU and backward-compatible 16 MHz), while retaining backward compatibility with older cards. This configuration proved to be so popular for Apple's Performa line that later 68040 such as the Macintosh LC 475 and PowerPC-based versions were essentially emulating the 68030 pin signals for the LC slots that they inherited.

=== Quadra PDS (Motorola 68040) ===
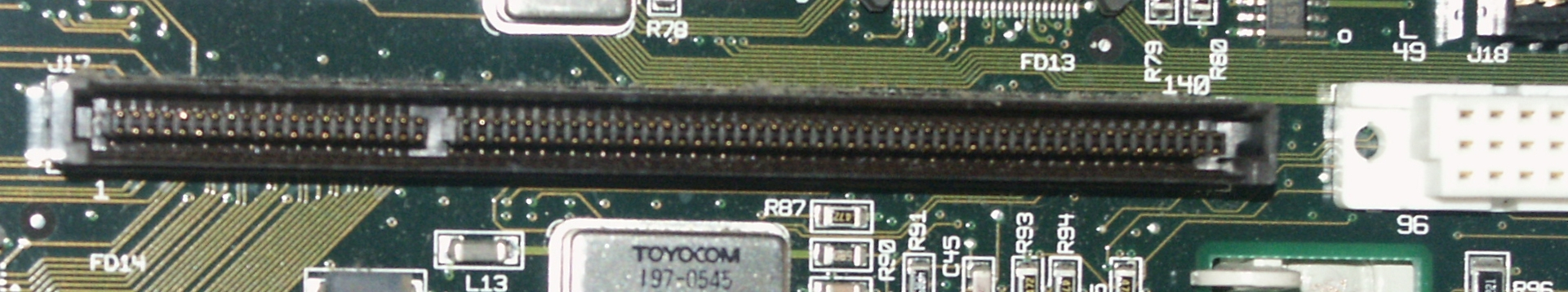
PDS-Connector in a Macintosh Quadra 950

The Macintosh Quadra series was introduced in 1991 with a new PDS for the Motorola 68040 processor which was in-line with one of the NuBus slots. The Quadra 605 and Quadra 630 were exceptions which used the full 114-pins version of the LC slot. Both allowed for PowerPC upgrades, including through the "Ready for PowerPC upgrade" program, using Apple's Macintosh Processor Upgrade Card.

=== Duo Dock connector (Motorola 68030 / NuBus) ===
The PowerBook Duo line was introduced in 1992 with a unique 68030-based connector that could allow the subnotebook logic board to communicate with an array of desktop docking systems, some of which could be upgraded with floating-point units. Because of the complexity of larger Duo Docks, NuBus was used to manage parts of the subsystems.

=== Power Macintosh PDS (PowerPC 601) ===
First generation Power Macintosh systems with NuBus architecture, such as the 6100, 7100, and 8100, included a PDS that was used for high-speed AV cards. It was later used by third-party manufacturers to support PowerPC G3 and G4 upgrades.

=== PowerPC daughtercard slot ===
High-end second generation Power Macintosh systems with PCI architecture, such as the 7500 through 9600, had their PowerPC 601 and 604 processors on daughtercards which could be swapped out for PowerPC G3 and G4 upgrades.

=== PowerPC cache slot ===
Mid-range Power Macintosh systems based on PowerPC 603e processors with PCI architecture, such as the 5400, 5500, and 6360 through 6500, featured an L2 cache slot which provided direct access to the CPU. This allowed enterprising third-party manufacturers to build PowerPC G3 upgrades for this slot.

More recent Macs have such high processor speeds that a PDS would not be practical and instead adopted PCIe and Thunderbolt (interface). The last implementation resembling such a slot by Apple is the processor tray connector in the 2009 to 2012 Mac Pros. More recent models have had Intel Xeon processors socketed directly to the logic board.

== See also ==
- PCI
