= Macintosh IIx =

Personal computer by Apple, Inc

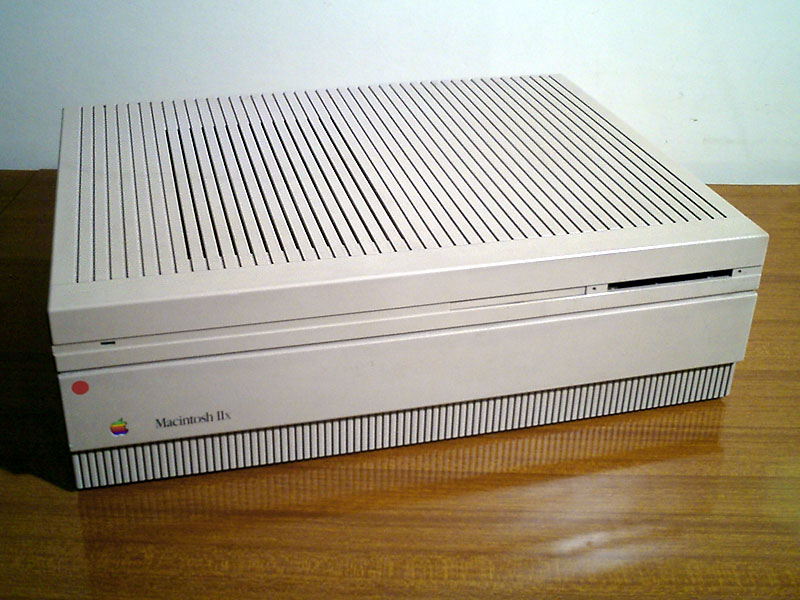
- A Macintosh IIx
- Developer: Apple Computer
- Product family: Macintosh II
- Released: September 19, 1988; 38 years ago
- Introductory price: US$7,769 (equivalent to $21,149 in 2025)
- Discontinued: October 15, 1990; 36 years ago
- Operating system: System 6.0.1 – 7.5.5; A/UX 1.0.1 – 3.1.1
- CPU: Motorola 68030 @ 16 MHz
- Memory: 1 or 4 MB, expandable to 128 MB (120 ns 30-pin SIMM)
- Dimensions: Height: 5.5 inches (14 cm); Width: 18.7 inches (47 cm); Depth: 14.4 inches (37 cm)
- Weight: 24 pounds (11 kg)
- Predecessor: Macintosh II
- Successor: Macintosh IIfx
- Related: Macintosh SE; Macintosh SE/30; Macintosh IIci; Macintosh IIcx

The Macintosh IIx is a personal computer designed, manufactured, and sold by Apple Computer from September 1988 to October 1990. This model was introduced as an update to the original Macintosh II, replacing the 16 MHz Motorola 68020 CPU and 68881 FPU with a 68030 CPU and 68882 FPU running at the same clock speed. The initial price of the IIx was US$7,769 (equivalent to $21,149 in 2025) or US$9,369 (equivalent to $25,505 in 2025) for the version with an 80 MB hard drive.

The 800 KB floppy drive was replaced with a 1.44 MB SuperDrive; the IIx is the first Macintosh to include this as standard.

The 68030 in the Mac IIx included 256 bytes of instruction cache and 256 bytes of data cache, providing an estimated 10-15% increase in performance over the 68020 in the Mac II. The 68882 provided up to double the floating point performance. The IIx had a 16 MHz bus (1:1 with CPU speed) and supported up to System 7.5.5.

The IIx was the second of three Macintosh models to use this case allowing dual floppy drives and 6 NuBus slots; the last model was the Macintosh IIfx. Apple's nomenclature of the time used the "x" to indicate the presence of the 68030 CPU as used in the Macintosh IIcx and IIvx.

Support and spare parts for the IIx were discontinued on August 31, 1998.

== Timeline ==
Timeline of Macintosh II family models
