= Local bus =

In computer architecture, a local bus is a computer bus that connects directly, or almost directly, from the central processing unit (CPU) to one or more slots on the expansion bus. The significance of direct connection to the CPU is avoiding the bottleneck created by the expansion bus, thus providing fast throughput. There are several local buses built into various types of computers to increase the speed of data transfer (i.e. bandwidth). Local buses for expanded memory and video boards are the most common. VESA Local Bus and Processor Direct Slot were examples of a local bus design.

Although VL-Bus was later succeeded by AGP, it is not correct to categorize AGP as a local bus. Whereas VL-Bus operated on the CPU's memory bus at the CPU's clock speed, an AGP peripheral runs at specified clock speeds that run independently of the CPU clock (usually using a divider of the CPU clock).

== See also ==
- OPTi Inc., which had its own bespoke local bus expansion slot design in the early 1990s
