= Apple Scanner =

1988 image scanner by Apple Computer

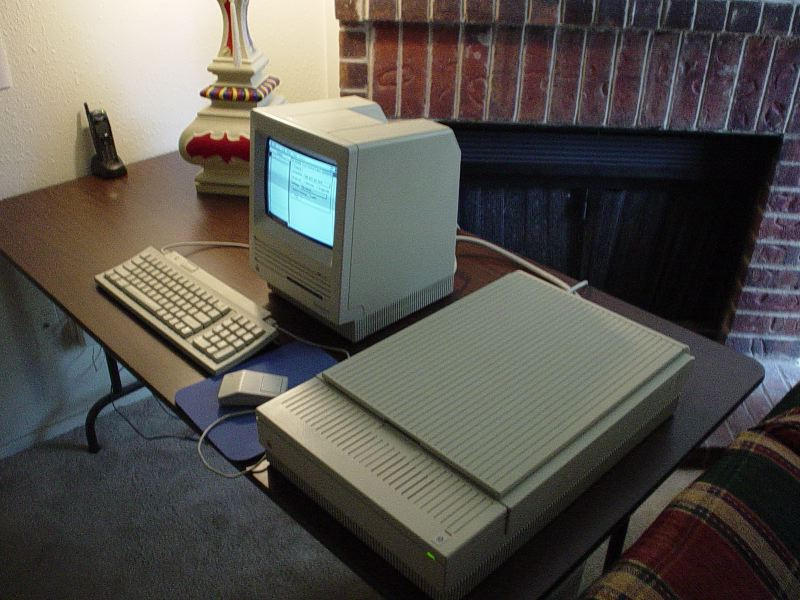
Apple Scanner attached to a Macintosh SE

The Apple Scanner was a flatbed image scanner released by Apple Computer in August 1988. It was Apple's first scanner, capable scanning A4 (8.5 in × 14.0 in) paper at a bit depth of 4 bits (16 levels of grey) at a maximum resolution of 300 dpi.

== Overview ==
The scanner could complete a full scan in 20.4 seconds. It shipped with a SCSI connection with an unused serial port.

To control the scanner, it came with both AppleScan and HyperScan, the latter allowed users to scan directly from within HyperCard. Later, only AppleScan was offered.

Many internal components are branded "Toshiba" and "TEC", suggesting that the OEM of the Apple Scanner was Toshiba TEC.

The scanner was upgraded to the short-lived Apple OneScanner in 1991 with 256 levels of grey.

== See also ==
- Drum scanner
