= Macintosh SE/30 =

Personal computer released by Apple Computer

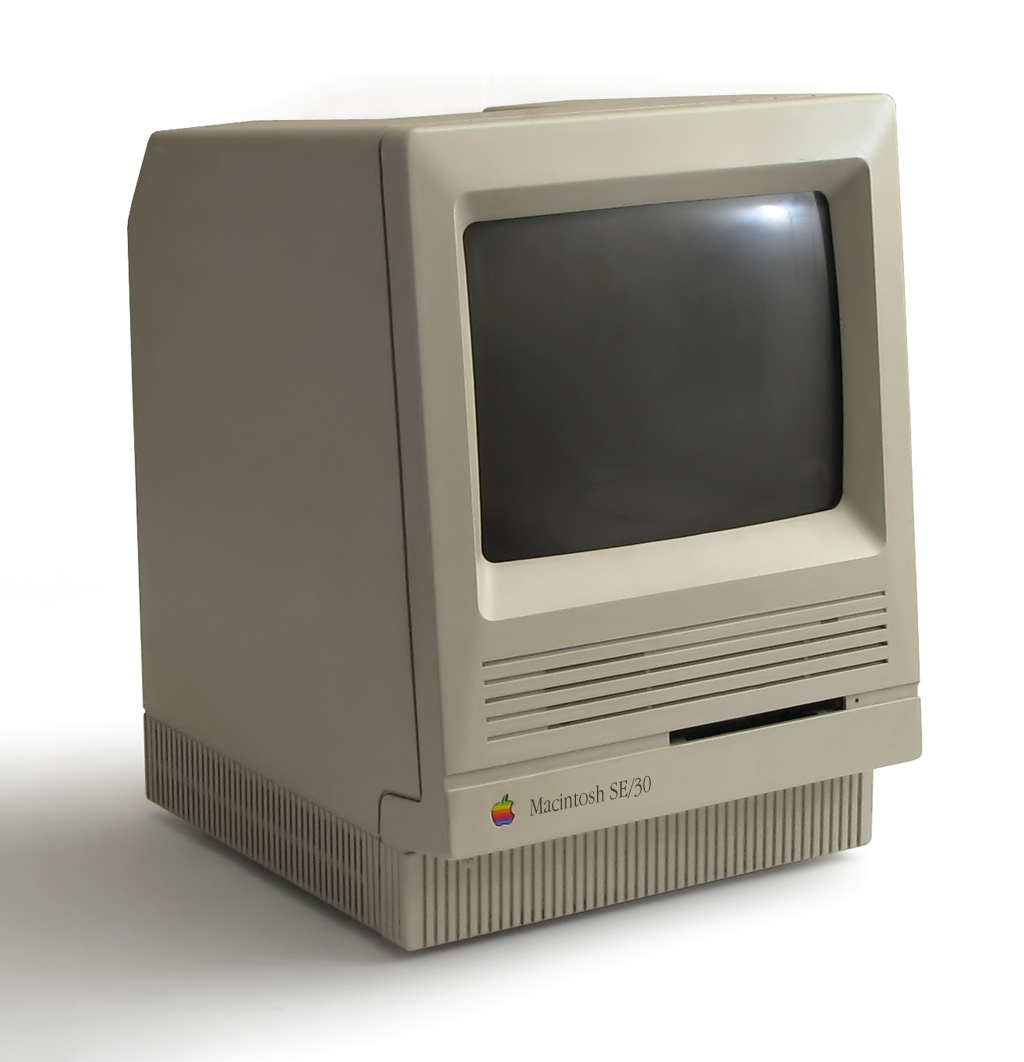
- Manufacturer: Apple Computer
- Product family: Compact Macintosh
- Type: All-in-one
- Released: January 19, 1989; 37 years ago
- Introductory price: US$4,369 (equivalent to $11,350 in 2025)
- Discontinued: October 21, 1991; 35 years ago
- Operating system: System 6.0.3 – 7.5.5; A/UX 1.1.1 – 3.1.1
- CPU: Motorola 68030 @ 15.667 MHz; Motorola 68882 FPU
- Memory: 1 or 4 MB, expandable to 32 MB (120 ns 30-pin SIMM)
- Removable storage: 3 1/2-inch 1.44 MB SuperDrive floppy disk
- Display: 9-inch (23 cm) monochrome, 512 × 342
- Dimensions: Height: 13.6 in (35 cm); Width: 9.6 in (24 cm); Depth: 10.9 in (28 cm)
- Weight: 19.5 lb (8.8 kg)
- Predecessor: Macintosh SE
- Successor: Macintosh Classic; Macintosh Classic II
- Related: Macintosh IIx; Macintosh IIfx; Macintosh II; Macintosh IIcx; Macintosh IIci; Macintosh Portable

The Macintosh SE/30 is a personal computer designed, manufactured and sold by Apple Computer from January 1989 to October 1991. It is the fastest of the original black-and-white compact Macintosh series.

The SE/30 has a black-and-white monitor and a single Processor Direct Slot (rather than the NuBus slots of the IIx, with which the SE/30 shares a common architecture) which supported third-party accelerators, network cards, or a display adapter. The SE/30 could expand up to 128 MB of RAM (a significant amount of RAM at the time), and included a 40 or 80 MB hard drive. It was also the first compact Mac to include a 1.44 MB high density floppy disk drive as standard (late versions of the SE had one, but earlier versions did not). The power of the SE/30 was demonstrated by its use to produce the This Week newspaper, the first colour tabloid newspaper in the UK to use new, digital pre-press technology on a personal, desktop computer.

In keeping with Apple's practice, from the Apple II+ until the Power Macintosh G3 was announced, a logic board upgrade was available for US$1,699 to convert a regular SE to an SE/30. The SE would then have exactly the same specs as an SE/30, with the difference only in the floppy drive if the SE had an 800 KB drive. The set included a new front bezel to replace the original SE bezel with that of an SE/30.

Although this machine was succeeded in Q4 of 1990 by the Macintosh Classic, the SE/30 wasn't discontinued until 1991 by the Macintosh Classic II, which despite featuring the same processor and clock speed, was only 60% as fast as the SE/30 due to its 16-bit data path, supported no more than 10 MB of memory, lacked an internal expansion slot, and made the Motorola 68882 FPU an optional upgrade.

== Hardware ==
Mainboard of the SE/30

The SE/30's exterior has few differences from the SE. The rear ports are identical but the SE/30's audio port is stereo. An internal 40MB or 80MB hard drive was available; the SE/30 is incompatible with Hard Disk 20. The floppy drive is a SuperDrive, similar to the Macintosh IIx; there is no room for a second. Another IIx similarity is the 16 MHz Motorola 68030 CPU and 16 MHz 68882 FPU, about five times faster for general computing than the SE's 8 MHz Motorola 68000 CPU and no FPU.

The SE/30 has 64K of dedicated video RAM unlike the SE, improving display performance by avoiding memory interleaving. The Processor Direct Slot has 32-bit lines and is not compatible with the SE's internal slot. The SE/30 has eight SIMM slots, up from the SE's four. Apple designed the computer for compatibility with higher-density memory modules, stating at its debut that the SE/30 would be able to use 4MB modules when available to up to 32MB of total RAM; at least half the slots must match. The 256K ROM is almost identical to the IIx's, including grayscale and Color QuickDraw support, and installs into its own SIMM slot for easy upgradability.

Although the SE/30's 68030 supports 32-bit addressing, the computer's ROM, as with the IIx, includes some code using 24-bit addressing, rendering the ROM "32-bit dirty". This limits the actual amount of RAM that can be accessed to 8 MB under System 6.0.8. A system extension called MODE32 enables access to installed extra memory under System 6.0.8. Under System 7.0 up to System 7.5.5, the SE/30 can use up to 128 MB of RAM. Alternatively, replacing the ROM SIMM with one from a Mac IIsi or Mac IIfx makes the SE/30 "32-bit clean" and thereby enables use of up to 128 MB RAM and System 7.5 through OS 7.6.1.

The computer shipped with System 6.0.3. A standard SE/30 can run up to System 7.5.5, since Mac OS 7.6 requires a "32-bit clean" ROM.

Although Apple did not support doing so at the SE/30's launch, with 68030's PMMU, the SE/30 can run A/UX, Apple's older version of Unix with Mac OS compatibility.

From March 1989 Apple offered an upgrade for SE owners to the SE/30 by replacing the logic board and chassis, although they cannot reuse the SE's 150ns RAM. Though there was no official upgrade path for the SE/30, several third-party processor upgrades were available. A 68040 upgrade makes it possible to run Mac OS 8.1, which extended the SE/30's productive life for many more years. Also extending the useful life of the SE/30 were Micron Technology video cards. Three cards were available, which fit into the SE/30's Processor Direct Slot: the 8-bit Gray-Scale 30; the SE/306-48, 640x480 resolution 8-bit color; and SE/3010-78, 1024x768 resolution 8-bit color. With the first, the internal display was 8-bit greyscale; the latter two were used with 13" and 14", respectively, external color monitors, while retaining 1-bit (black and white) on the internal monitor.

== Models ==
- Macintosh SE/30: Available in multiple configurations.
  - 1 MB RAM, no hard disk. US$4,369 (equivalent to $11,348 in 2025).
  - 1 MB RAM, 40 MB hard disk. US$4,869 (equivalent to $12,646 in 2025).
  - 4 MB RAM, 80 MB hard disk. US$6,569 (equivalent to $17,062 in 2025).

== Reception ==
Nick Baran of BYTE in February 1989 approved of the SE/30's performance improvements over the SE and Mac II, stating that the only reasons to instead buy a IIx were the latter's NuBus slots and official support for A/UX. Bruce F. Webster thought in Macworld in March 1989 that the SE/30 would compete well with NeXT Computer in the education market, albeit lacking Unix. He questioned the computer's high non-education price—suggesting a Macintosh II, or an SE with accelerator card, to those without a computer—but predicted that the SE/30's 68030 would remain viable longer than the II's Motorola 68020. Webster concluded that the SE/30 did not "break new ground. It does, however, establish Apple's commitment to the classic Mac product line, and it provides users with an Apple-supported alternative to either a small, slow Mac or a large, powerful one. More important, it fills a gap in the Macintosh family ... a new level of power and portability for the Macintosh community". Henry Bortman of MacUser was surprised that Apple announced the SE/30 instead of a laptop or smaller Mac II, but approved of the company retaining the same compact form factor. He noted that at $5069, the 40MB model cost the same as the similarly configured SE's former price. Doug and Denise Green found in InfoWorld that the SE/30 was about 1.5 times as fast as the Mac II, equal in speed to the IIx, and 5.5 times as fast as the IBM PC AT. Noting that it was $1300 less expensive than a comparable IIx without monitor, they advised those not needing the IIx's slots to choose the SE/30 and perhaps use the saved money for an external display. Conversely, the Greens advised those considering a 1MB SE without hard drive to consider spending $1600 more for the SE/30's superior hardware.

In a January 2009 Macworld feature commemorating the 25th anniversary of the Macintosh, three industry commentators – Adam C. Engst of TidBITS, John Gruber of Daring Fireball, and John Siracusa of Ars Technica – chose the SE/30 as their favorite Mac model of all time. "Like any great Mac," wrote Gruber, "the SE/30 wasn't just a terrific system just when it debuted; it remained eminently usable for years to come. When I think of the original Mac era, the machine in my mind is the SE/30."

The SE/30 remains popular with hobbyists, and has been described as “the best computer Apple will ever make,” with used models selling for a significant premium relative to other machines of the era. Contemporary PDS upgrades allowed an SE/30's internal monitor to be upgraded to support 256 shades of gray (the only original-design Macintosh to support such an upgrade) or a 68040 processor, and the SE/30's standard RAM limit of 128 MB greatly exceeded even that of much later models such as the Color Classic and Macintosh LC II. In 2018, add-ons and software became available to add WiFi and even make the SE/30 work as a remote control for Spotify.

== In popular culture ==
In the NBC TV series Seinfeld, Jerry has an SE/30 sitting on the desk of his apartment during the first few seasons. This would be the first of many Macs to occupy the desk, including a PowerBook Duo and a Twentieth Anniversary Macintosh.

In the FX series It's Always Sunny in Philadelphia, the Waitress is seen with a Macintosh SE/30 on her bedroom desk in the episode "The Gang Gives Back".

In the film Watchmen, Ozymandias has an all-black TEMPEST-shielded SE/30 on his desk.

In Season 15 Episode 4 of Death in Paradise, a Macintosh SE/30 can be seen on the desk in the victim’s office.

== Timeline ==
Timeline of Compact Macintosh models
See also: List of Mac models and Compact Macintosh
