= Macintosh IIci =

Personal computer by Apple, Inc.

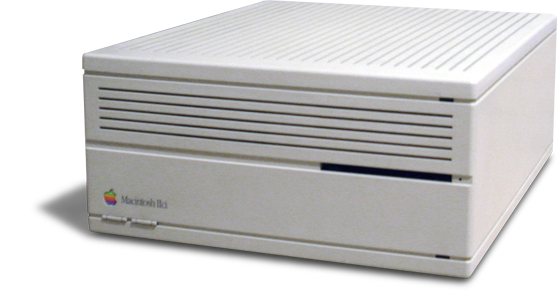
- A Macintosh IIci
- Also known as: "Aurora II", "Pacific"
- Developer: Apple Computer, Inc.
- Product family: Macintosh II
- Released: September 20, 1989
- Lifespan: 3 years, 4 months
- Introductory price: US$6,269 (equivalent to $16,300 in 2025)
- Discontinued: February 10, 1993
- Operating system: System 6.0.4 – 7.6.1; A/UX 1.1.1 – 3.1.1
- CPU: Motorola 68030 @ 25 MHz
- Memory: 1 or 4 MB, expandable to 128 MB (80 ns 30-pin SIMM)
- Dimensions: Height: 5.5 in (140 mm); Width: 11.9 in (300 mm); Depth: 14.4 in (370 mm)
- Weight: 13.6 lb (6.2 kg)
- Predecessor: Macintosh IIcx
- Successor: Macintosh Quadra 700; Macintosh Centris 650; Macintosh Quadra 800
- Related: Macintosh IIsi; Macintosh SE/30; Macintosh Classic; Macintosh Portable

The Macintosh IIci is a personal computer designed, manufactured, and sold by Apple Computer from September 1989 to February 1993. It is a more powerful version of the Macintosh IIcx, which was released earlier that year, and uses the same compact case design. The IIci has three NuBus expansion slots and a Processor Direct Slot. It uses a 25 MHz Motorola 68030 CPU and a 25 MHz Motorola 68882 FPU (floating-point unit), replacing the 16 MHz versions used in the IIcx. Unlike the IIcx, the IIci has built-in video, which provides display output without occupying a NuBus slot but uses some system RAM.

The Macintosh Quadra 700 was introduced in late 1991 as a higher-performance workstation, but at a substantially higher price than the IIci. By then, Apple authorized resellers were offering entry-level IIci systems for under US$4,000 (equivalent to $9,500 in 2025), while the Quadra 700 was introduced at prices above US$6,000 (equivalent to $14,200 in 2025). Apple continued selling the IIci until February 1993, when it was discontinued as the Centris 650 and Quadra 800 entered the product lineup.

== Hardware ==
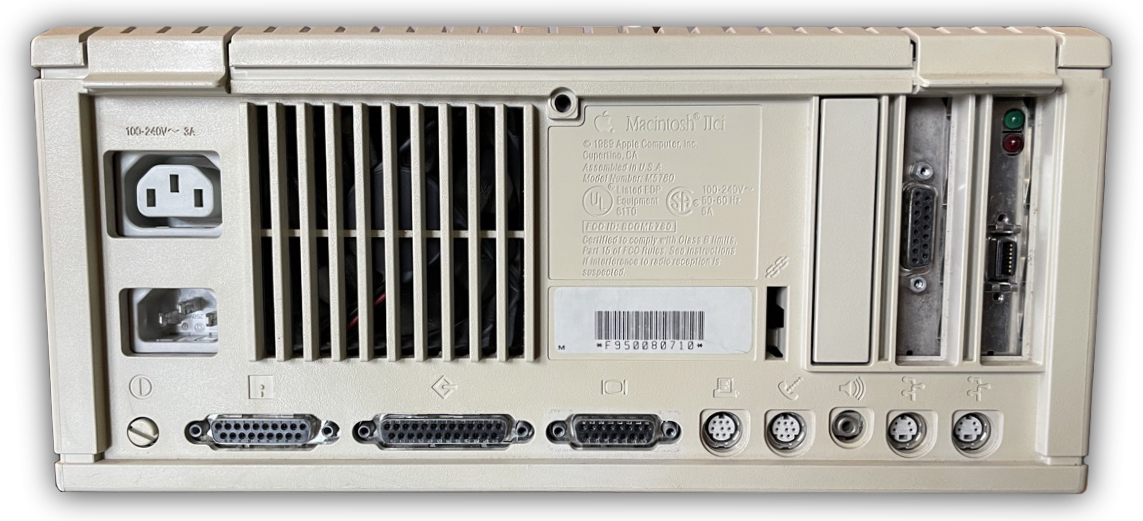
Rear view of a Macintosh IIci

The IIci introduced several technical and architectural enhancements, some of which were important in preparing for System 7 (which was then called the Blue project) and would influence future Macintoshes, though some of them came at the cost of compatibility:

- a new, 32-bit clean ROM with built-in 32-bit QuickDraw that consists of two parts: one that is the same across all Macintoshes, and the "overpatch area" that is specific to each Macintosh.
- discontiguous physical memory that is mapped into a contiguous memory area by the MMU. Some of the System 7 virtual memory functions had to be added to the ROM to support getting the physical address of the memory.
- an optional 32 KB Level 2 cache. The cache card, which fit into the Processor Direct Slot (initially called a "cache connector" by Apple), was later included in all systems at no charge. Third-party cards offered up to 128 KB, but the added cache size yielded little benefit over the base card.
- a first for a modular Macintosh — onboard graphics for an external display. This freed one of the system's three NuBus slots. However, because the integrated graphics used the system's RAM for its framebuffer, some users used a NuBus graphics card to reclaim the lost memory. Also, it was popular to install faster memory in the first bank of SIMM slots, as this is the bank used by the video subsystem. The onboard graphics supported up to 8-bit color at resolutions of either 640 × 480 or 512 × 384.

The IIci was one of the most popular and longest-lived Macintosh models of the 20th century. For much of its lifespan, it was the business "workhorse" of the Macintosh line. For a short time in 1989, before the introduction of the 40 MHz Macintosh IIfx, the IIci was the fastest Mac available.

The IIci came with either a 40- or an 80-megabyte hard disk. It was initially available with no storage, before that option was discontinued.

The later lower-cost IIsi is essentially a cut-down IIci with the system clock reduced to 20 MHz, FPU now optional, a different memory controller and half the RAM slots lowering maximum RAM from 128 to 17 MB and the level 2 cache slot and 3 NuBus slots removed (although the IIsi's PDS slot could hold a bridge card offering one NuBus slot).

=== Upgradability ===
DayStar Digital offered several processor upgrades for the Macintosh IIci. The PowerCache used 40 or 50 MHz Motorola 68030 processors, while the Turbo 040 used 33 or 40 MHz Motorola 68040 processors. The Turbo 601 upgrade used a PowerPC 601 processor running at 66 or 100 MHz.

Other manufacturers, including Sonnet Technologies and Diimo, also produced 68030 and 68040 upgrades. The MicroMac DiiMO 030, for example, used a 50 MHz 68030 with an optional Motorola 68882 FPU and plugged directly into the IIci's Processor Direct Slot.

When the Quadra 700 was released in 1991, a logic board upgrade was made available for the IIci to upgrade it to the performance level of the Quadra.

=== Easter eggs ===
An easter egg exists in the IIci ROM. If the system date is set to September 20, 1989 (the machine's release date) and the ⌘ Command+⌥ Option+C+I keys are held during boot time, an image of the development team will be displayed.

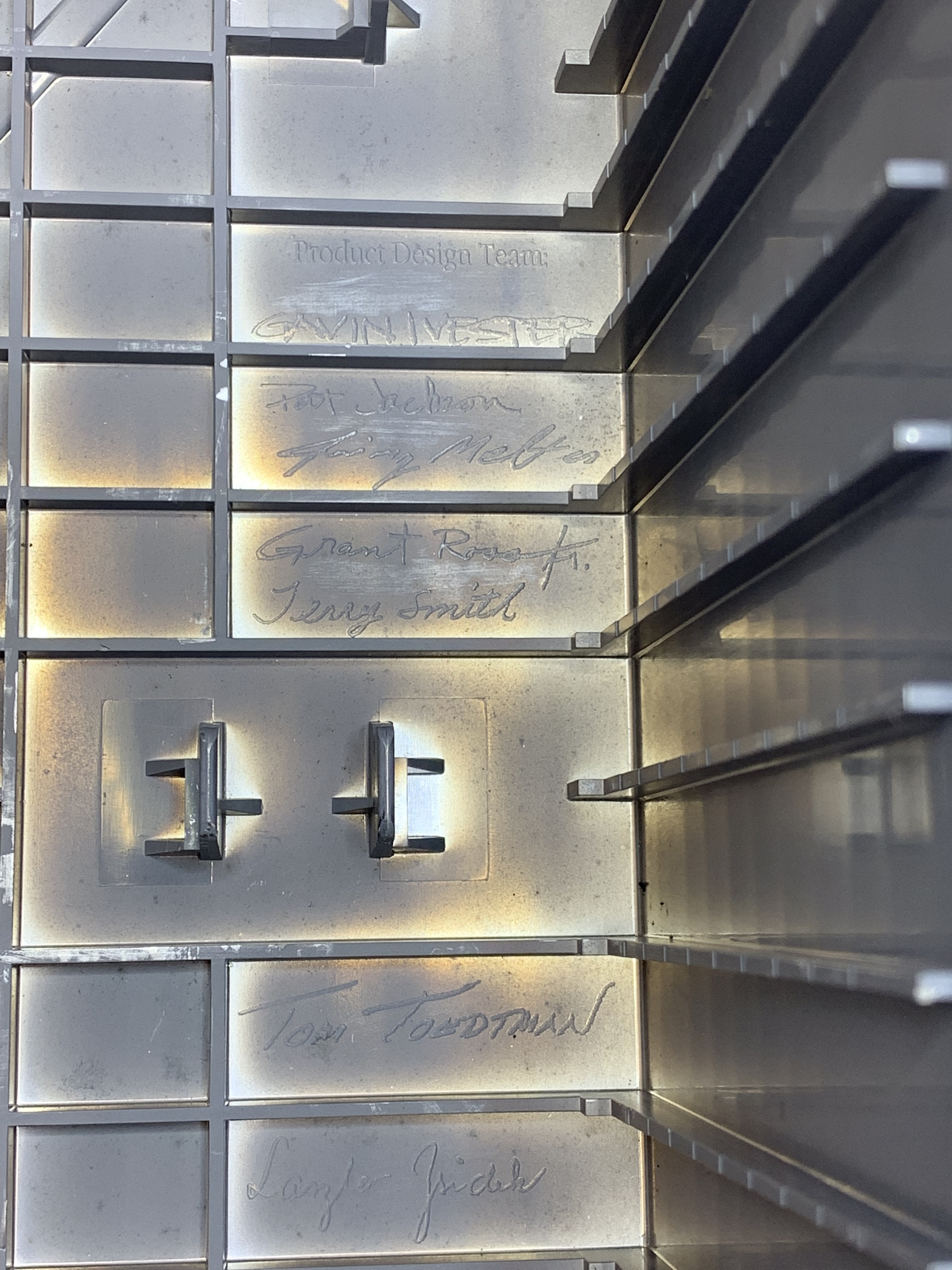
Mac IIci Product Design Team Signatures (under logic board)

The signatures of the product design team can be seen in the molded plastic of the case if one removes the motherboard.

== Timeline ==
Timeline of Macintosh II family models
