= Macintosh IIsi =

Personal computer by Apple, Inc

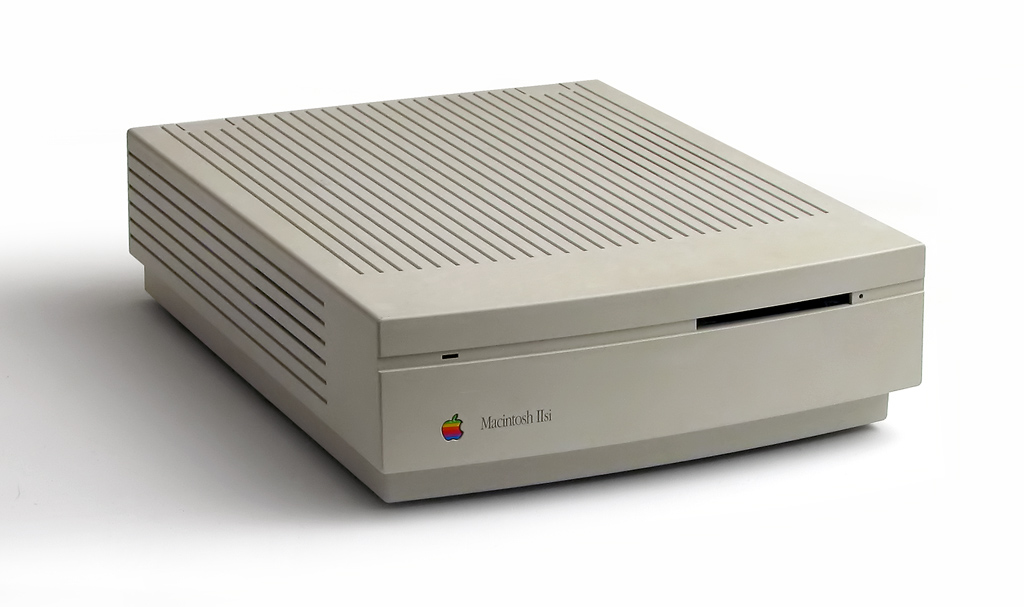
- A Macintosh IIsi
- Codename: Ericson, Raffica, Oceanic, Ray Ban
- Developer: Apple Computer, Inc.
- Product family: Macintosh II
- Released: October 15, 1990
- Introductory price: US$3,800 (equivalent to $9,360 in 2025)
- Discontinued: March 15, 1993
- Operating system: System 6.0.7 – 7.6.1; A/UX 2.0.1 – 3.1.1
- CPU: Motorola 68030 @ 20 MHz
- Memory: 2 or 5 MB, expandable to 17 MB (100 ns 30-pin SIMMs)
- Storage: 40 or 80 MB hard disk
- Removable storage: 3 1/2-inch 1.44 MB SuperDrive floppy disk
- Dimensions: 4 × 12.4 × 14.9 in (10 × 31 × 38 cm)
- Weight: 10 lb (4.5 kg)
- Predecessor: Macintosh IIcx
- Successor: Macintosh Centris 610

The Macintosh IIsi is a personal computer designed, manufactured and sold by Apple Computer, Inc. from October 1990 to March 1993. Introduced as a lower-cost to alternative to other desktop computers in the Macintosh II family, it was positioned between the Macintosh LC and higher-priced Macintosh II models. Like the LC, the IIsi included built-in sound support and supported color displays at resolutions up to 640 × 480 pixels with 8-bit color.

The IIsi remained on the market for two and a half years and was discontinued shortly after the introduction of its replacement, the Centris 610.

== History ==
Following Steve Jobs's departure from Apple in 1985, chief executive officer John Sculley appointed Jean-Louis Gassée to lead Macintosh development. Gassée pursued a premium-pricing strategy that emphasized higher-margin products rather than competing primarily on price. Apple executives expected customers to continue paying more for computers with greater performance and capabilities.

The strategy came under pressure as desktop publishing software became available on less expensive IBM PC compatible computers, giving customers alternatives to the Macintosh. Apple experienced a decline in sales during the 1989 holiday season, followed by a 20 percent drop in its stock price. Gassée left Apple in 1990.

In January 1990, Gassée resigned and his authority over product development was divided among several successors. Many Apple engineers had long been pressing for lower-cost options in order to build market share and increase demand across the entire price spectrum. With Gassée out, a rush started to quickly introduce a series of low-cost machines. Three market points were identified: a very low-cost machine with a target price of $1,000, a low-cost machine with color graphics, and a more upscale color machine for small business use. In time, these would develop as the Macintosh Classic, Macintosh LC, and Macintosh IIsi, respectively.

=== Release ===
On October 15, 1990, Sculley introduced the Classic, LC and IIsi at a press conference at Apple's factory in Fremont saying, "To reach new customers, we didn't just lower the prices of our existing products. We redesigned these computers from the ground up with the features customers have told us they value most. Apple's new strategy caused concern among investors, who thought it would reduce profit margins. Brodie Keast, an Apple product marketing manager, said, "We are prepared to do whatever it takes to reach more people with Macintosh. The plan is to get as aggressive on price as we need to be."

== Hardware ==
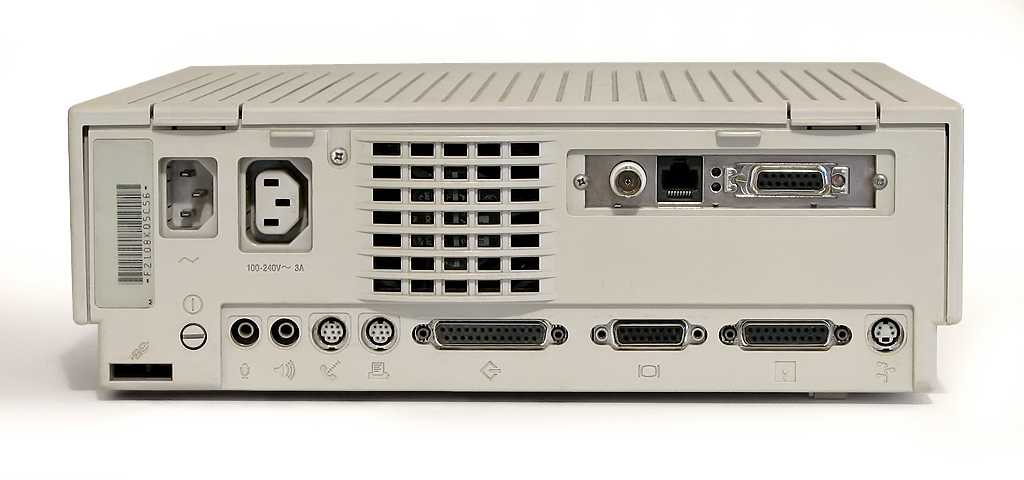
Macintosh IIsi rear view, showing ports and optional Ethernet card with 10base2, 10baseT and AUI connectors

The Macintosh IIsi used a compact desktop case designed specifically for this model. It was positioned below the Macintosh IIci, and replaced the IIcx as Apple's entry-level professional Macintosh.

It was designed for rapid and inexpensive manufacturing with just six basic components going into the case: logic board, power supply, hard drive, floppy drive, fan and speaker. Clips and latches secured the components, allowing assembly without tools.

The IIsi shared much of its architecture with the IIci but used a redesigned motherboard and a slower 20 MHz processor, compared with the IIci's 25 MHz processor. Its memory controller limited the maximum supported RAM to 17 MB, compared with 128 MB in the IIci. The IIsi also omitted the IIci's three NuBus expansion slots and level 2 cache slot, retaining only a single Processor Direct Slot (PDS) for expansion.

Two optional adapter cards were available for the IIsi for US$249 (equivalent to $610 in 2025). One allowed NuBus cards compatible with other computers in the Macintosh II family to connect to the IIsi's PDS, while the other supported PDS cards designed for the Macintosh SE/30. Both adapters included a Motorola 68882 FPU and mounted the expansion card horizontally above the motherboard.

The IIsi was sold with either a 40 MB or an 80 MB internal SCSI hard disk. These drives used a one-third-height form factor, which later became more widely used than the half-height drives found in earlier Macintosh II models. The computer also included an internal 3 1/2-inch, 1.44 MB SuperDrive floppy disk drive. Its external ports included a DA-15 video output, a SCSI port, two serial ports, an ADB port, a floppy disk port, a 3.5 mm stereo headphone output, and a microphone input.

The built-in video circuitry supported resolutions of 640 × 480 or 512 × 384 pixels, with up to 8-bit color. To reduce costs, the video system used main system memory rather than dedicated video memory. The computer included 1 MB of RAM soldered to the motherboard, while additional memory could be installed in SIMM slots. Using faster SIMM memory for video operations could improve graphics performance, leading many users to set the disk cache size large enough to force the computer to use the SIMM memory for video purposes.

Some IIsi computers developed intermittent sound problems when the contacts connecting the speaker to the motherboard deteriorated. The speaker was mounted on a separate board beneath the motherboard, using spring contacts. Vibration could cause fretting at the contact surfaces, disrupting the electrical connection. The problem could be corrected by removing the motherboard and using a pencil eraser to clean the contacts.

== Models ==
The Macintosh IIsi was offered in two configurations:

- Macintosh IIsi 2/40 with 2 MB RAM and a internal 40 MB SCSI hard disk, initially priced at US$3,800 (equivalent to $9,360 in 2025).
- Macintosh IIsi 5/80 with 5 MB RAM and a internal 80 MB SCSI hard disk, initially priced at US$4,600 (equivalent to $11,340 in 2025).

== Known users ==
Charles Bukowski was an enthusiastic user of the IIsi.

== Timeline ==
Timeline of Macintosh II family models
