= Macintosh Classic =

Personal computer by Apple Computer

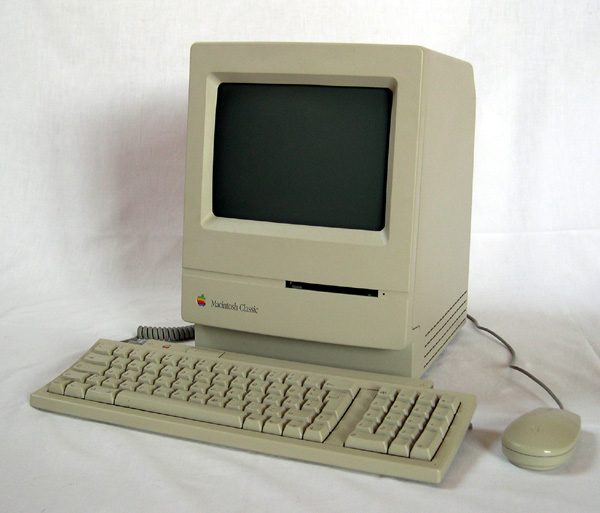
- Macintosh Classic
- Also known as: "XO"
- Manufacturer: Apple Computer
- Product family: Compact Macintosh
- Type: All-in-one
- Released: October 15, 1990; 36 years ago
- Introductory price: US$999 (equivalent to $2,460 in 2025)
- Discontinued: September 14, 1992
- Operating system: System 6.0.3–7.5.5
- CPU: Motorola 68000 @ 7.8336 MHz
- Memory: 1 MB, expandable to 4 MB (120 ns 30-pin SIMM)
- Storage: 40 MB hard disk (optional)
- Removable storage: 3 1/2-inch 1.44 MB SuperDrive floppy disk
- Display: 9-inch (23 cm) monochrome, 512 × 342
- Dimensions: Height: 13.2 in (34 cm); Width: 9.7 in (25 cm); Depth: 11.2 in (28 cm)
- Weight: 16 lb (7.3 kg)
- Predecessor: Macintosh Plus; Macintosh SE
- Successor: Macintosh Classic II
- Related: Macintosh LC; Macintosh IIsi

The Macintosh Classic is a personal computer designed, manufactured, and sold by Apple Computer from October 1990 to September 1992. It was the first Macintosh to sell for less than US$1,000. The fourth generation of Apple's Compact Macintosh family, it followed the original Macintosh, Macintosh Plus, and Macintosh SE. The Classic retained many of their limitations, including the same monochrome CRT display with a pixel resolution of 512 × 342, the same Motorola 68000 CPU and the 4 megabyte (MB) memory limit.

Reviewers criticized the Classic's lack of a color display, faster processor, or greater memory capacity. Macworld described it as "unexceptional" and as having "nothing to gloat about beyond its low price". However, its low price and compatibility with existing Macintosh software contributed to strong demand, which Apple initially struggled to meet.

Compared with the Macintosh Plus, which it replaced as Apple's entry-level Macintosh, the Classic was up to 25% faster, with performance comparable to the Macintosh SE. It was offered in two configurations. The base model included 1 MB of memory, a 3 1/2-inch 1.44 MB SuperDrive floppy disk drive, and no hard disk, and sold for US$999 (equivalent to $2,460 in 2025). A model with 2 MB of memory and a 40 MB hard disk sold for US$1,500 (equivalent to $3,700 in 2025). Both models lacked a Processor Direct Slot and had only a memory expansion slot.

The Classic adapted the industrial design of the original 1984 Macintosh, created by Jerry Manock and Terry Oyama. Its low price and the availability of education software led to the Classic's popularity in schools. It was sold alongside the more powerful Macintosh Classic II from 1991 until its discontinuation the next year.

== History ==
=== Development ===
After Apple's co-founder Steve Jobs left Apple in 1985, product development was handed to Jean-Louis Gassée, formerly the manager of Apple France. Gassée consistently pushed the Apple product line in two directions, towards more "openness" in terms of expandability and interoperability, and towards higher price. Gassée long argued that Apple should not aim for the low end of the computer market, where profits were thin, but instead concentrate on the high end and higher profit margins. He illustrated the concept using a graph showing the price-performance ratio of computers with low-power, low-cost machines in the lower left and high-power high-cost machines in the upper right. The "high-right" goal became a mantra among the upper management, who said "fifty-five or die", referring to Gassée's goal of a 55 percent profit margin.

The high-right policy led to a series of machines with ever-increasing prices. The original Macintosh plans called for a system around $1,000, but by the time it had morphed from Jef Raskin's original vision of an easy-to-use machine for composing text documents to Jobs's concept incorporating ideas gleaned during a trip to Xerox PARC, the Mac's list price had ballooned to $2,495.

With the "low-left" of the market it had abandoned years earlier booming with Turbo XTs, and being ignored on the high end for UNIX workstations from the likes of Sun Microsystems and SGI, Apple's fortunes of the 1980s quickly reversed. The Christmas season of 1989 drove this point home, with the first decrease in sales in years, and an accompanying 20 percent drop in Apple's stock price for the quarter.

In January 1990, Gassée resigned and his authority over product development was divided among several successors. Many Apple engineers had long been pressing for lower-cost options in order to build market share and increase demand across the entire price spectrum. With Gassée out, a rush started to quickly introduce a series of low-cost machines. Three market points were identified: a very low-cost machine with a target price of $1,000, a low-cost machine with color graphics, and a more upscale color machine for small business use. In time, these would develop as the Classic, Macintosh LC, and Macintosh IIsi, respectively.

=== Release ===
MacWEEK magazine reported on July 10, 1990, that Apple had paid $1 million to Modular Computer Systems Inc., a subsidiary of Daimler-Benz AG, for the right to use the "Classic" name as part of a five-year contract. Apple did not renew the contract when it ended. MacWEEK speculated the Macintosh Classic would use the same 8 MHz Motorola 68000 microprocessor and 9-inch (23 cm) display as its predecessors and that the Classic would be priced from $1,500 to 2,150.

On October 15, 1990, John Sculley (then Apple CEO) introduced the Classic at a press conference, announcing that pricing would start at $1,000 and saying, "To reach new customers, we didn't just lower the prices of our existing products. We redesigned these computers from the ground up with the features customers have told us they value most." Apple's new pricing strategy caused concern among investors, who thought it would reduce profit margins. Brodie Keast, an Apple product marketing manager, said, "We are prepared to do whatever it takes to reach more people with Macintosh [...] The plan is to get as aggressive on price as we need to be." After the release of the Classic, Apple's share price closed at $27.75 per share, down $0.50 from October 12, 1990, and far below its previous 12-month high of $50.37.

The Classic displaced both the Macintosh Plus and SE in Apple's product lineup, Macworld described the machine as having the performance and features of an SE (except an expansion slot), and costing less than the slower, more limited Plus.

The Classic was released in Europe and Japan concurrently with the United States release. In Japan, the Classic retailed for ¥198,000 ($1,523), more than in the US but matching the price of the Toshiba Dynabook laptop computer.

After spending $40 million marketing the Classic to first-time buyers, Apple had difficulty meeting the high demand. Apple doubled its manufacturing space in 1990 by expanding its Singapore and Cork, Ireland factories, where the Classic was assembled. Air freight, rather than sea shipping, was used to speed delivery. The shortage caused concern among dealers, who blamed Apple's poor business planning.

Macintosh Classics and LCs had been given to Scholastic Software 12 weeks before they were officially announced, and Scholastic planned to release 16 new Macintosh products in 1991. Peter Kelman, Scholastic's publisher, predicted that the Macintosh would become "the school machine of the nineties." The Classic was sold to schools for $800. This, and the availability of educational software, led to the Classic's popularity in the education sector.

== Features ==
The base model was sold with 1 MB of memory, a 1.44 MB SuperDrive floppy drive, no hard disk for US$999 (equivalent to $2,460 in 2025). A model with 2 MB of memory and a 40 MB hard disk sold for US$1,500 (equivalent to $3,700 in 2025). The Classic replaced the Macintosh Plus as Apple's entry-level computer and was up to 25% faster than the Plus, with performance comparable to the Macintosh SE. The standard SuperDrive could read and write Macintosh, MS-DOS, OS/2, and ProDOS disks. Memory could be expanded to 4 MB.

The Classic originally shipped with System 6.0.7 and supports up to System 7.5.5. It can also boot into a reduced version of System 6.0.3 stored in ROM by holding down ⌘ Command+⌥ Option+X+O during startup. This feature allows the computer to start without an internal drive or a boot disk in the floppy drive.

Some dealers offered the Macintosh Classic with Smartbundle, a software package also sold separately for US$349 (equivalent to $860 in 2025). It included WriteNow, a word processor by T/Maker; Full Impact, a spreadsheet program by Ashton-Tate; the RecordHolderPlus database; and version 2.0 of SuperPaint, a graphics program by Silicon Beach Software.

== Design ==
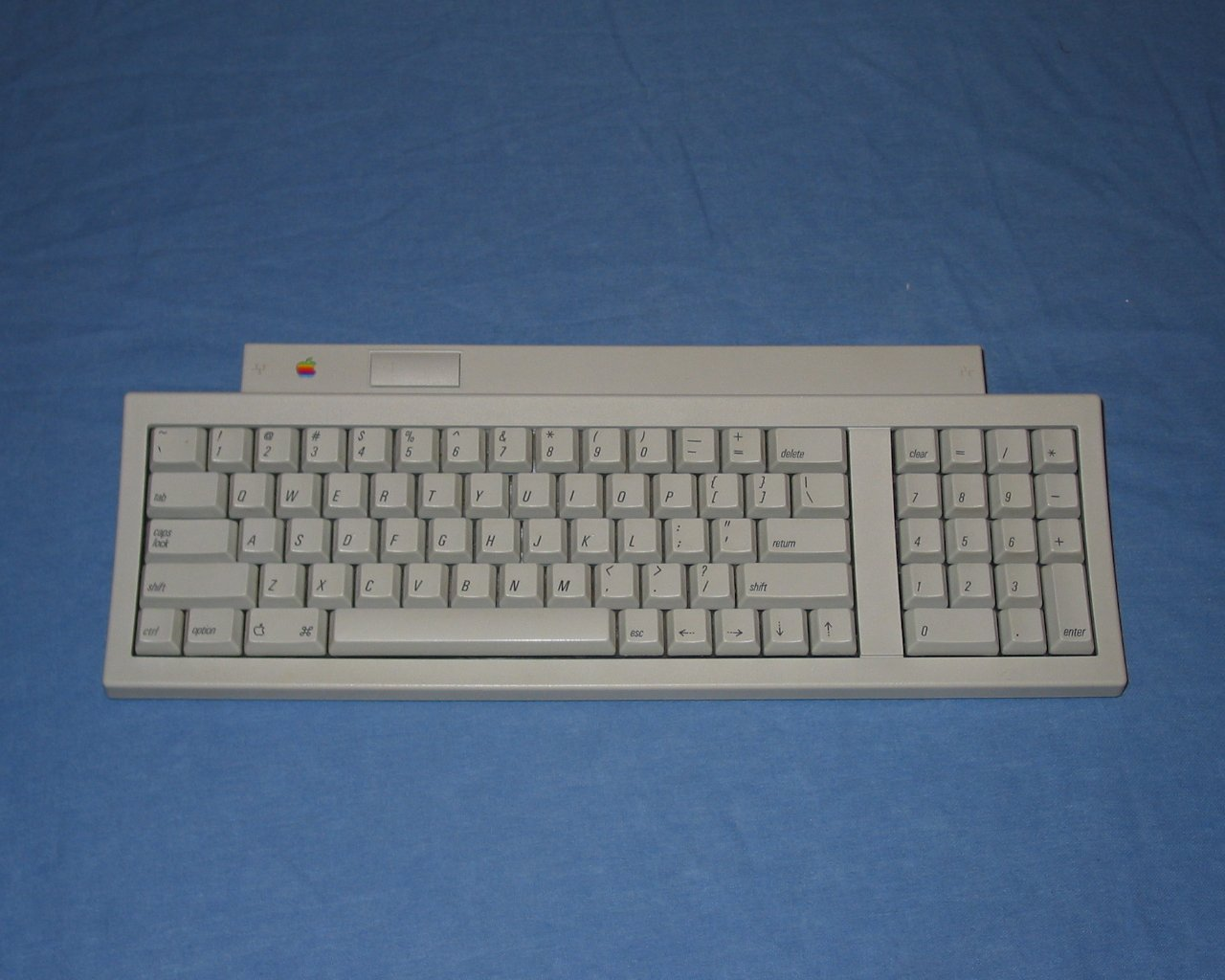
The Apple Keyboard II is the Macintosh Classic's standard keyboard.

The Macintosh Classic is the final adaptation of Jerry Manock's and Terry Oyama's Macintosh 128K industrial design, bringing back some elements of the original while retaining little of the Snow White design language used in the Macintosh SE's design. The only remnant of the SE is the stripe across the front panel (bezel) for the floppy drive; the distinctive front bezel lines of the SE were not used on the Classic, and the vertical lines around its base are replaced by four horizontal vent lines, more reminiscent of the original design. Also, the curve of the front bezel was increased to the same 50-inch (1.3 m) radial curve as on the front of both the Macintosh LC and Macintosh IIsi. The screen brightness dial on this bezel was also removed in favor of a software control. This broad, curved front bezel became a signature of Apple product design for much of the 1990s.

The logic board, the central circuit board of the computer, is based on the Macintosh SE design. Its size, however, was reduced using surface-mount technology to 9 × 5 inches (23 × 13 cm), half the size of the SE board. This redesign, and the absence of expansion slots, kept manufacturing costs low. This lack of expansion abilities, along with the small screen size and Macintosh's popularity in desktop publishing, led to such oddities as video displays that connected through the SCSI port by users seeking to connect a larger full- or dual-page display to their Mac. The Classic design was used once more in 1991 for the Classic II, which succeeded the Classic.

== Reception ==
Some reviewers of the Macintosh Classic focused on the processor performance and lack of expansion slots. Liza Schafer of Home Office Computing praised the Classic's ease of use and price, but criticized the 9-inch (230 mm) display because a full US letter page (8.5 by 11 inches; 220 mm × 280 mm) would not fit at full size, and warned those who required high-end graphics and desktop publishing capabilities against buying the Classic. Schafer concluded: "The Classic's value is more impressive than its performance, but its performance will get you working on that novel, database, or spreadsheet." PC Week criticized the lack of a faster processor, stating, "The 7.8 MHz speed is adequate for text applications and limited graphics work, but it is not suitable for power users. As such, the Classic is appropriate as a home computer or for limited computing on the road." Similarly, PC User's review concluded, "The slow processor and lack of expansion slots on the Macintosh Classic offset the low prices". MacWEEK described it as a "fine, inexpensive replacement for the Macintosh Plus that best embodies the original Macintosh vision six and a half years later". Computer Gaming World was more skeptical, doubting that consumers would purchase a black-and-white computer with no hard drive that was only slightly faster than the Mac Plus.

In the February 1991 edition of Electronic Learning, Robert McCarthy wrote: "Teachers, educational administrators, and software developers are enthusiastic about the new, lower-cost Apple Macintosh computers". Steve Taffe, manager of instructional strategy at MECC, a developer and publisher of educational software, explained his excitement about the Classic: "[it] is terrific – both because it's a Mac and because of that low price. Everyone can now afford a Macintosh." Scholastic, an educational software developer, was also confident of Apple's ability to compete with MS-DOS machines, stating: "They are just as cost-effective and as powerful as MS-DOS computers, but the Apples will have a superior comfort level." Sue Talley, Apple's manager of strategic planning in education, said of the Classic: "we see it going into applications where you need a fair number of powerful stations, but where color is not a big issue." Talley mentioned that it was most suited for writing labs and other basic productivity uses. Many schools decided not to buy the Macintosh Classic because of the lack of a color monitor, an option that the higher-priced Macintosh LC had. The popular Apple IIe Card also increased the LC's appeal to schools. Although the Classic was more popular at first, by May 1992 the LC (560,000 sold) was outselling the Classic (1.2 million sold).

== Specifications ==
Component	Specification
Display	9-inch (23 cm) monochrome CRT display, 512 × 342 pixel resolution
Storage	40 MB SCSI hard disk drive optional; built-in SuperDrive 3.5 in floppy disk drive
Processor	8 MHz Motorola 68000
Bus Speed	8 MHz
Random-access memory	1 MB, expandable to 2 or 4 MB using 120 ns 30-pin SIMMs and optional custom RAM-slot expansion card
Read-only memory	512 KB
Networking	AppleTalk
Battery	3.6 V Lithium
Physical dimensions	13.2 in × 9.7 in × 11.2 in (340 mm × 250 mm × 280 mm) (height × width × depth); 16 lb (7.26 kg)
Port connections	1× ADB (keyboard, mouse); 2× mini-DIN-8 RS-422 serial ports (printer, modem, AppleTalk); 1× DB-19 (ext. floppy drive); 1× DB-25 SCSI connector (ext. hard drive, scanner); 1× 3.5 mm Headphone jack socket
Expansion slots	none
Audio	8-bit mono 22 kHz
Gestalt ID	17 (computer identification code)
Codename	XO

== Timeline ==
Timeline of Compact Macintosh models
See also: List of Mac models and Compact Macintosh

== See also ==
- Basilisk II, emulator with limited support
- Mini vMac, emulator capable of booting from the ROM disk
- List of Mac models grouped by CPU type
