= Macintosh SE =

Fourth model of Apple's Macintosh computer line

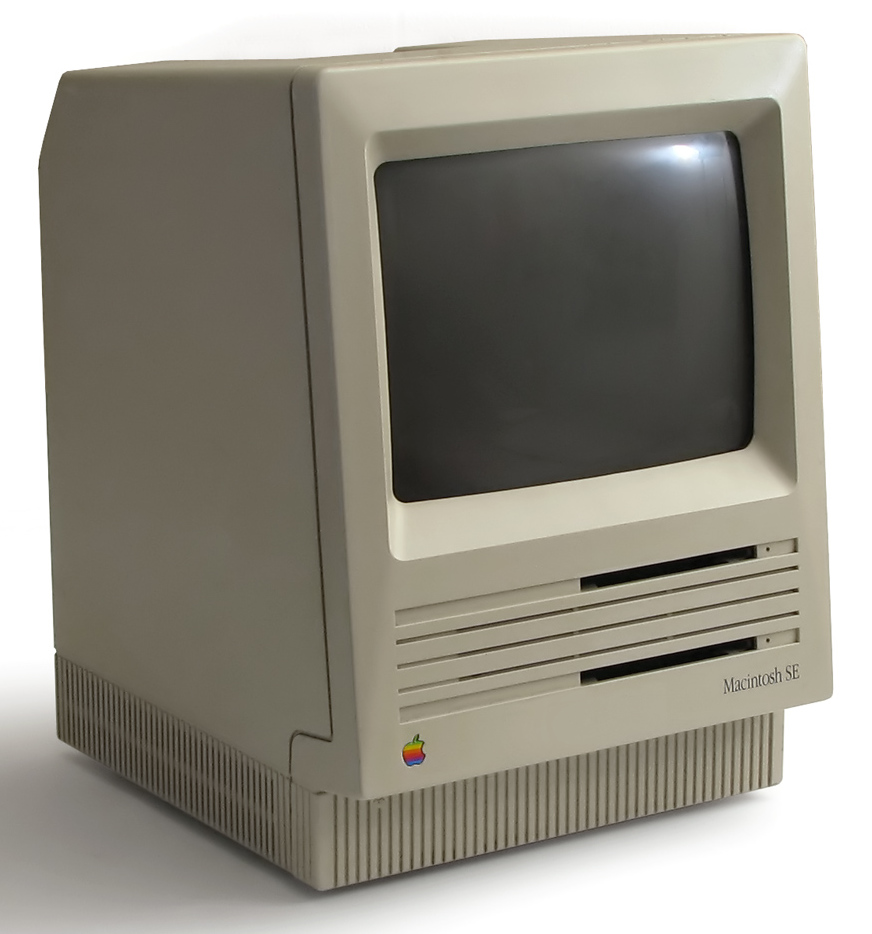
- Macintosh SE with dual floppy drives
- Also known as: Macintosh SE FDHD; Macintosh SE SuperDrive
- Manufacturer: Apple Computer
- Product family: Compact Macintosh
- Type: All-in-one
- Released: March 2, 1987; 39 years ago
- Introductory price: US$2,900 (equivalent to $8,218 in 2025)
- Discontinued: October 15, 1990; 36 years ago
- Operating system: System 4 – System 7.5.5
- CPU: Motorola 68000 @ 7.8 MHz
- Memory: 1 MB, expandable to 4 MB (150 ns 30-pin SIMM)
- Removable storage: 3 1/2-inch 800K or 1.44 MB SuperDrive floppy disk
- Display: 9 in (23 cm) monochrome, 512 × 342
- Dimensions: Height: 13.6 in (35 cm); Width: 9.69 in (24.6 cm); Depth: 10.9 in (28 cm)
- Weight: 17 lb (7.7 kg)
- Predecessor: Macintosh 512Ke; Macintosh Plus
- Successor: Macintosh SE/30; Macintosh Classic
- Related: Macintosh II
- Made in: USA

The Macintosh SE is a personal computer designed, manufactured, and sold by Apple Computer, from March 1987 to October 1990. It marked a significant improvement on the Macintosh Plus design, notably due to its modular and expandable functionality, and was introduced by Apple at the same time as the Macintosh II.

The SE retained the same Compact Macintosh form factor as the original Macintosh computer introduced three years earlier, but used the Snow White design language of the Macintosh II. An enhanced model, the SE/30, was introduced in January 1989, although sales of the original SE continued. The Macintosh SE was updated in August 1989 to include a SuperDrive, with this updated version being called the Macintosh SE FDHD and later the Macintosh SE SuperDrive. The Macintosh SE was replaced by the Macintosh Classic, a very similar model that retained the same central processing unit but at a lower price point.

== Overview ==
The Macintosh SE was introduced at the AppleWorld conference in Los Angeles on March 2, 1987. The "SE" is an initialism for "System Expansion". Its notable new features, compared to its similar predecessor, the Macintosh Plus, were:

- First compact Macintosh with an internal drive bay for a hard disk (originally 20 MB or 40 MB) or a second floppy disk drive.
- First compact Macintosh to feature an expansion slot.
- First Macintosh to support the Apple Desktop Bus (ADB), previously only available on the Apple IIGS, for keyboard and mouse connections.
- Improved SCSI support, providing faster data throughput (double that of the Macintosh Plus) and a standard 50-pin internal SCSI connector.
- Better reliability and longer life expectancy (15 years of continuous use) due to the addition of a cooling fan.
- 25 percent greater speed when accessing RAM, resulting in a lower percentage of CPU time being spent drawing the screen. In practice this results in a 10-20 percent performance improvement.
- Additional fonts and kerning routines in the Toolbox ROM
- Disk First Aid is included on the system disk

The SE and Macintosh II were the first Apple computers since the Apple I to be sold without a keyboard. Instead the customer was offered the choice of the new ADB Apple Keyboard or the Apple Extended Keyboard.

Apple produced ten SEs with transparent cases as prototypes for promotional shots and employees. They are extremely rare and command a premium price for collectors.

=== Operating system ===
The Macintosh SE shipped with System 4.0 and Finder 5.4; this version is specific to this computer. (The Macintosh II, which was announced at the same time but shipped a month later, included System 4.1 and Finder 5.5.) The README file included with the installation disks for the SE and II is the first place Apple ever used the term "Macintosh System Software", and after 1998 these two versions were retroactively given the name "Macintosh System Software 2.0.1".

== Hardware ==
Processor: Motorola 68000, 8 MHz, with an 8 MHz system bus and a 16-bit data path.

RAM: The SE came with 1 MB of RAM as standard, and is expandable to 4 MB. The logic board has four 30-pin SIMM slots; memory must be installed in pairs and must be 150 ns or faster.

Video: The built-in 512 × 342 monochrome screen uses 21,888 bytes of main memory as video memory.

Storage: The SE can accommodate either one or two floppy drives, or a floppy drive and a hard drive above. After-market brackets were available to allow the SE to accommodate two floppy drives as well as a vertically oriented hard drive above them; however, this was not a configuration supported by Apple. In addition, an external floppy disk drive may also be connected, making the SE the only Macintosh besides the Macintosh Portable which could support three floppy drives, though its increased storage, RAM capacity and optional internal hard drive rendered external drives less of a necessity than for its predecessors. The hard disks were 20 and later 40 MB SCSI units that featured an activity LED visible from the front. Such indicators were customary on PCs of the era, while the SE was the first Macintosh ever to have one.

Battery: A 3.6 V 1/2AA lithium battery, which must be present in order for basic settings to persist between power cycles, is located on the logic board. Macintosh SE machines which have sat for a long time have experienced battery corrosion and leakage, resulting in a damaged case and logic board. Some SE models feature a board-mounted battery holder, while others have the battery soldered directly in place.

Expansion: A Processor Direct Slot on the logic board allows for expansion cards, such as accelerators, to be installed. The SE can be upgraded to 50 MHz and more than 5 MB with the MicroMac accelerators. In the past other accelerators were also available such as the Sonnet Allegro. Since installing a card required opening the computer's case and exposing the user to high voltages from the internal CRT, Apple recommended that only authorized Apple dealers install the cards; the case was sealed with then-uncommon Torx screws.

Upgrades: After Apple introduced the Macintosh SE/30 in January 1989, a logic board upgrade was sold by Apple dealers for US$1,699 as a high-cost upgrade for the SE, consisting of a new SE/30 motherboard, case front and internal chassis to accommodate the upgrade components.

ROM/Easter egg: The SE ROM size increased from 64 KB in the original Mac (and 128 KB in the Mac Plus) to 256 KB, which allowed the development team to include an Easter Egg hidden in the ROMs. By jumping to address 0x41D89A (or reading from the ROM chips), it is possible to display four images of the engineering team.

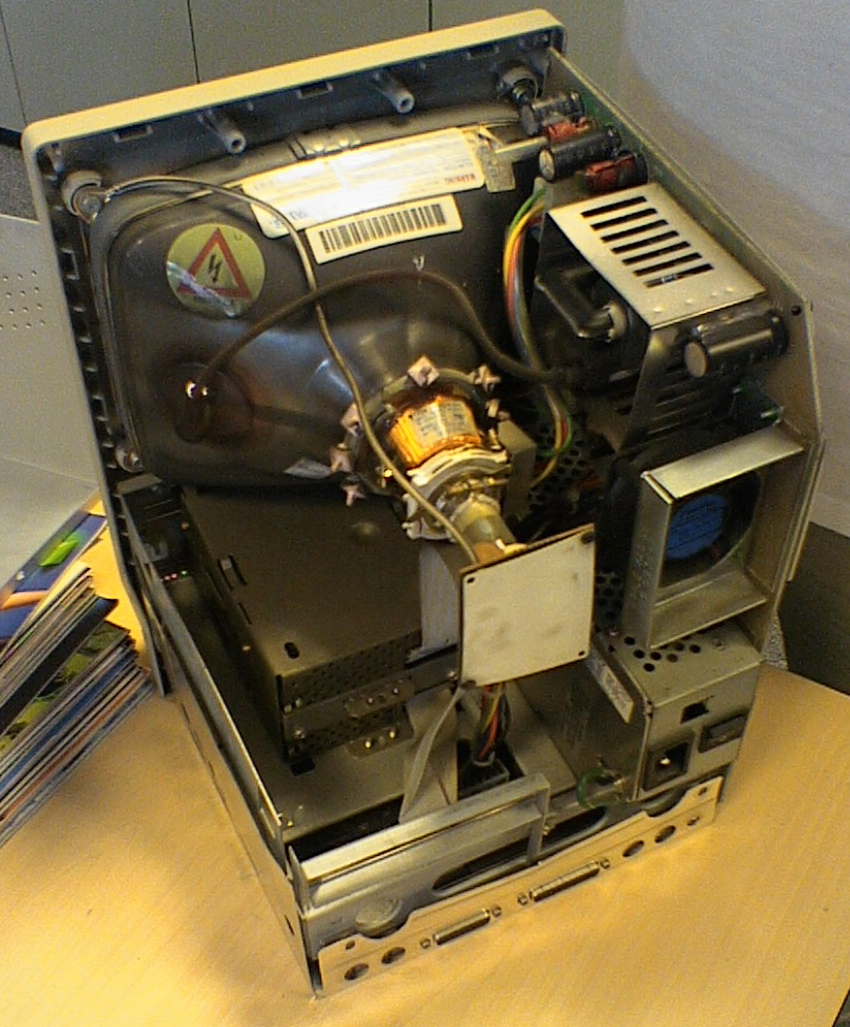
Inside the Macintosh SE

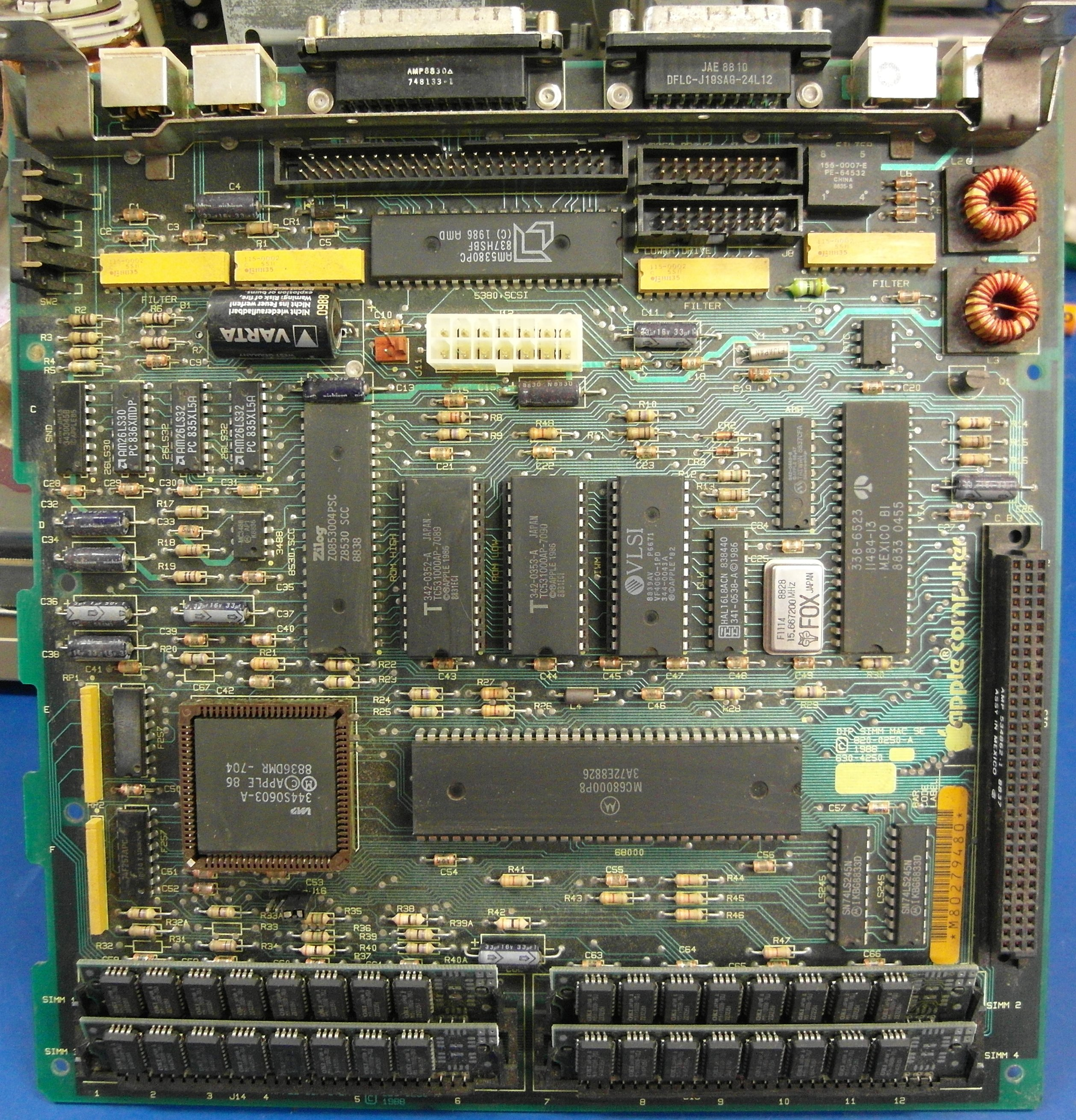
The main PCB from a 1988 Macintosh SE

== Models ==
Introduced March 2, 1987:

- Macintosh SE with 1 MB RAM and two 800K floppy drives, initially priced at US$2,900 (equivalent to $8,218 in 2025).
- Macintosh SE 1/20 with 1 MB RAM, one 800K drive and a 20 MB hard disk, initially priced at US$3,900 (equivalent to $11,052 in 2025).

In December 1987 Apple began using a quieter fan after many complaints, and offered it to existing customers for $90.

Introduced August 1, 1988:

- Macintosh SE 1/40 with 1 MB RAM, one 800K floppy drive and a 40 MB hard disk

Introduced August 1, 1989:

- Macintosh SE FDHD with the new SuperDrive, a floppy disk drive that can handle 1.4 MB High Density (HD) floppy disks. FDHD is an initialism for "Floppy Disk High Density"; later Macintosh SE FDHDs were labeled Macintosh SE SuperDrive, to conform to Apple's new marketing name for this drive. HD floppies would become the de facto standard on both the Macintosh and PC computers from then on. An upgrade kit was sold for the original Macintosh SE which included new ROM chips and a new disk controller chip, to replace the originals.

== Timeline ==
Timeline of Compact Macintosh models
See also: List of Mac models and Compact Macintosh

== See also ==
- Mini vMac
