= Macintosh IIcx =

Personal computer by Apple, Inc

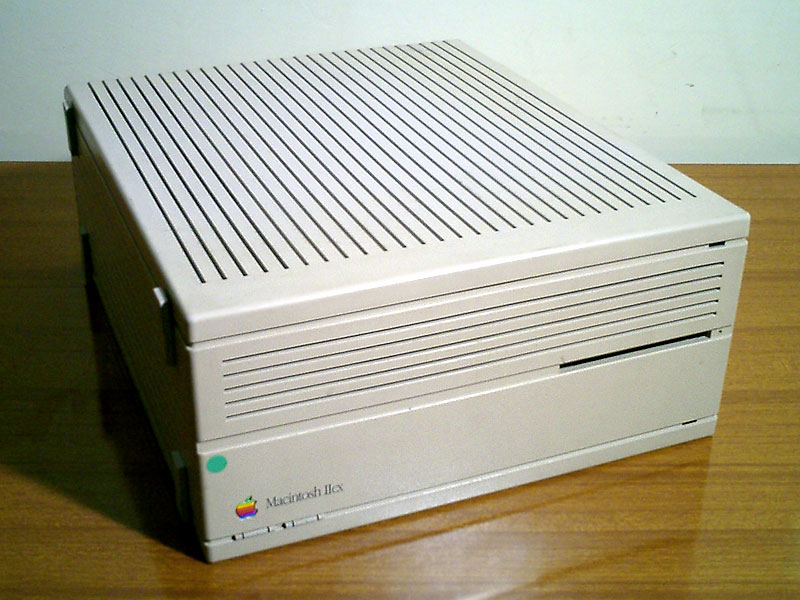
- Also known as: "Aurora"
- Developer: Apple Computer, Inc.
- Product family: Macintosh II
- Released: March 7, 1989
- Introductory price: US$5,369 (equivalent to $13,940 in 2025)
- Discontinued: March 11, 1991
- Operating system: System 6.0.3 – 7.5.5; A/UX 1.1 – 3.1.1
- CPU: Motorola 68030 @ 16 MHz
- Memory: 1 MB or 2 MB, expandable to 128 MB (120 ns 30-pin SIMM)
- Dimensions: Height: 5.5 inches (14 cm); Width: 11.9 inches (30 cm); Depth: 14.4 inches (37 cm)
- Weight: 13.6 pounds (6.2 kg)
- Predecessor: Macintosh II
- Successor: Macintosh IIci
- Related: Macintosh IIx

The Macintosh IIcx is a personal computer designed, manufactured and sold by Apple Computer, Inc. from March 1989 to March 1991. Introduced six months after the Macintosh IIx, the IIcx resembles the IIx and provides the same performance, but is seven inches (18 cm) narrower, ten pounds (4.5 kg) lighter, and quieter due to a smaller internal fan. The relative compactness results in three NuBus slots being available, compared with six on the IIx.

The new case, Apple's first to be designed to operate in either a horizontal or vertical orientation, remained in use for its successors the Macintosh IIci and Quadra 700. The idea for vertical orientation, one of the first minitower cases, was suggested by Apple CEO John Sculley, who was running out of space on his desk, despite the fact that the new layout actually took more space once the monitor was taken into account. The model was designated IIcx for compact (echoing the earlier Apple IIc), and the x was Apple's designation for the Motorola 68030 processor.

Rear view of a Macintosh IIcx

Inside view of a Macintosh IIcx

Users liked the Mac IIcx, in part, because its components and parts (such as the RAM, NuBus slots, and power supply) snapped into place inside the case without the need for screws. There was one central safety screw that tied the assembly together though it was often not reinstalled if ever removed. At the IIcx's introduction, Jean-Louis Gassée demonstrated the IIcx's modular design by assembling one from parts in front of the audience. This made it less expensive to build, easier to repair, and earned it heavy praise and a warm reception amongst the Mac community. The machine was also the lightest in Apple's lineup at the time. However, unlike the II and IIx, in many versions of the IIcx the CPU is soldered to the logic board and therefore cannot be upgraded. The case is also unable to accommodate 5 1/4" or full-height hard disk drives.

The llcx has three NuBus expansion slots, one of which needed to be populated by a video card.

This model was superseded by the Macintosh IIci, which used the same case. It was designed by Gavin Ivester.

== Timeline ==
Timeline of Macintosh II family models
