= PowerBook 150 =

Laptop by Apple Computer

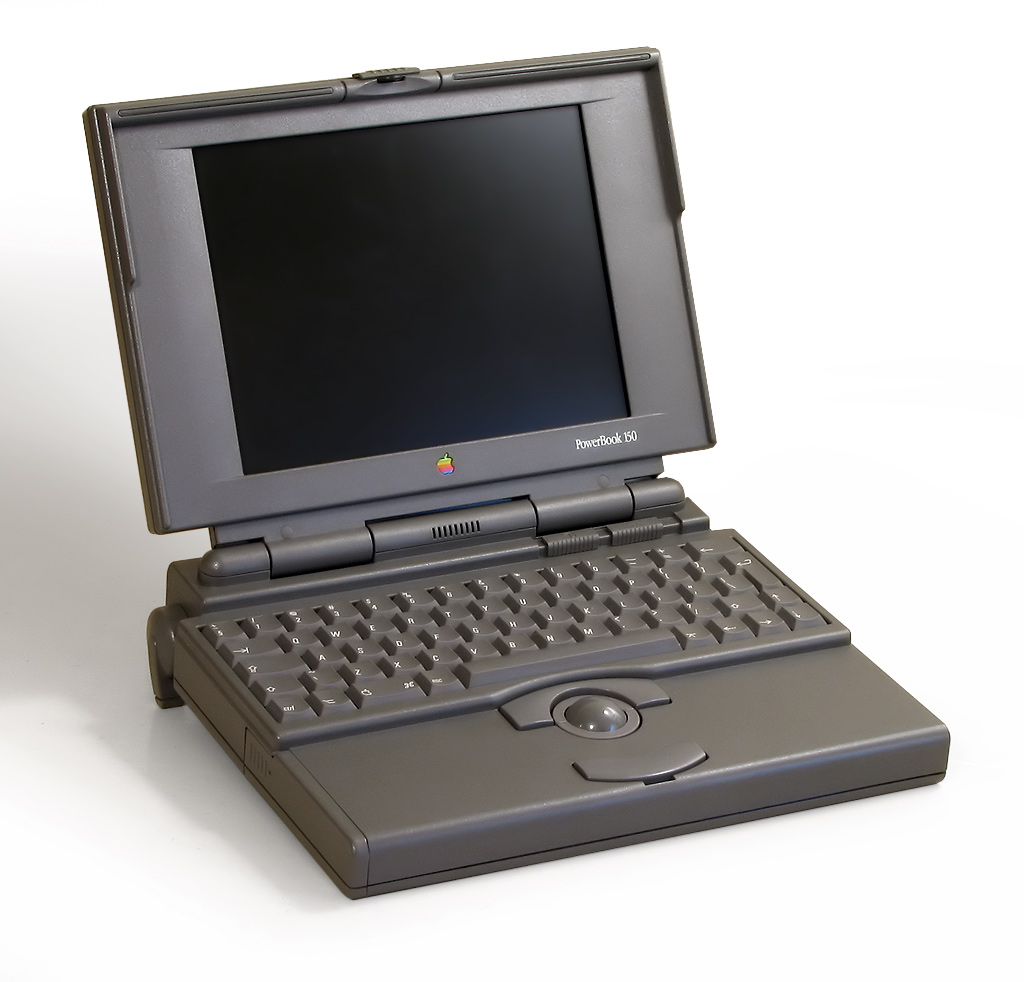
- PowerBook 150
- Codename: JeDI
- Developer: Apple Computer
- Manufacturer: Acer Inc.
- Product family: PowerBook (100 series)
- Type: Laptop (notebook)
- Released: July 18, 1994; 32 years ago
- Introductory price: US$1,450 (equivalent to $3,150 in 2025)
- Discontinued: October 14, 1995
- Operating system: System 7.1.1 – Mac OS 7.6.1
- CPU: Motorola 68030 @ 33 MHz
- Memory: 4–40 MB
- Storage: 80–120 MB IDE HDD
- Display: 9.5-inch monochrome passive-matrix LCD
- Dimensions: 11.25 × 9.3 × 2.25 in (286 × 236 × 57 mm)
- Weight: 5.8 lb (2.6 kg)
- Predecessor: PowerBook 145B
- Successor: PowerBook 190
- Related: PowerBook Duo series PowerBook 500 series
- Made in: Taiwan

The PowerBook 150 is a laptop computer manufactured by Acer for Apple Computer and sold from 1994 to 1995. It was positioned as an entry-level model in the PowerBook line, as a direct successor to the PowerBook 145B. Its launch price of US$1,450 (equivalent to $3,150 in 2025) was the cheapest for a PowerBook up to that point. It was positioned below the subcompact PowerBook Duo series and the high-end PowerBook 500 series. Apple targeted it at first-time notebook customers, students, and small office and home office workers.

The notebook features a 33 MHz Motorola 68030 processor and a monochrome passive-matrix LCD as its only display option. Despite retaining the outer case design of the PowerBook 100 series, the PowerBook 150's internal design borrows heavily from the PowerBook Duo line; its logic board is a slightly modified version of the Duo 230's, and it uses nearly identical memory modules. Lacking many of the peripheral ports of its predecessors, it was incapable of using Apple Desktop Bus devices, nor did it support video output. It was the first Macintosh to use the IDE interface for hard drives rather than the SCSI interface of its predecessors. It was both the last PowerBook to use the classic 100 series case design and trackball and the last Macintosh to use the 68030.

The PowerBook 150 received mixed reviews. Students and creative professionals appreciated its low price, while corporate buyers and journalists panned its lack of ports and lackluster performance. Apple discontinued it on October 14, 1995, succeeding it with the PowerBook 190.

== Development ==
The PowerBook 150 was a low-end entry in Apple's PowerBook 100 series, a line of notebook computers introduced in 1991 and based on the Macintosh platform. It succeeded the budget-oriented PowerBook 145B, introduced in 1993. Its principal designer was Matt Hershenson, who later co-founded Danger, Inc., a mobile computer design firm. Apple enlisted Acer Inc. of Taiwan to engineer and co-design the PowerBook 150. Around the time of the PowerBook 150's release, Apple signed a preliminary licensing agreement with Acer allowing the latter to develop PowerPC-based Macintosh clones running Apple's System 7 operating system for other computer vendors, in exchange for Acer manufacturing Macintosh systems for sale in China. During development, the PowerBook 150 was given the codename JeDI, short for "Just Did It". The name referred to the number of children born to core team members during development; twelve babies were born before the PowerBook 150 shipped.

At the time of its release, the PowerBook 150 was the only remaining model in the PowerBook 100 series, as its predecessors had already been discontinued. The mid-range and high-end positions previously occupied by the PowerBook 100 series had been replaced by the PowerBook 500 series, introduced in May 1994. The PowerBook 150 was the final model in the PowerBook line to use the original 100 series case design and the last to feature a built-in trackball as its pointing device. At its introduction, it was the lowest-end model in the PowerBook line.

== Specifications ==
The PowerBook 150 measures 11.25 by 9.3 by 2.25 inches (286 by 236 by 57 mm) and weighs approximately 5.8 pounds (2.6 kg). It was the lightest entry in the PowerBook 100 line, being 5.8 pounds (2.6 kg), 1.3 pounds (0.59 kg) lighter than the average of its predecessors. The PowerBook 150 is powered by a Motorola 68030 processor with a clock speed of 33 MHz. It is the final Macintosh ever to feature the 68030, first used with the Macintosh IIx in 1988. By the time of the PowerBook 150's introduction, the Motorola 68040 had become the standard processor for Apple's higher-end PowerBooks, with the PowerPC soon to take over the 68040's position. As with the PowerBooks 145 and 145B, the 150 lacks a slot for a FPU such as the Motorola 68881.

The PowerBook 150 was redesigned to reduce manufacturing costs. It used more economical components, including a 80 MB hard disk drive (HDD) with an industry-standard IDE interface in place of the more expensive SCSI drives used in earlier PowerBooks. It could be optioned with a 120 or 250 MB HDD. The notebook also sports a 3.5-inch floppy SuperDrive. As a cost-cutting mesasure, the SuperDrive in the PowerBook 150 has a manually operated spring-loaded mechanism, as opposed to earlier PowerBook SuperDrives that had motorized mechanisms for automatic insertion and ejection. The PowerBook 150 runs off a Ni–Cd battery that had an original rated life of two and a half hours.

The notebook's display is a 9.5-inch monochrome passive-matrix LCD with a native resolution of 640 by 480 pixels capable of displaying four shades of gray. The LCD of the PowerBook 150 was an improvement over its predecessors in terms of resolution and bit depth, as the LCDs of older PowerBooks were limited to 640 × 400 and 1-bit monochrome. Apple did not option the PowerBook 150 with an active-matrix LCD, however, which had far superior performance characteristics, including faster response times and less crosstalk.

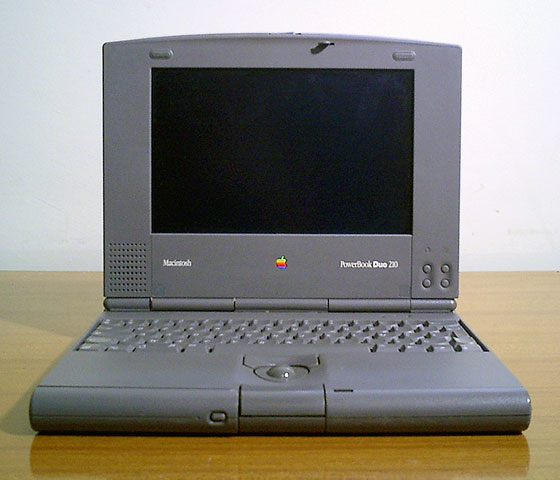
The internals of the PowerBook 150 borrow heavily from the PowerBook Duo, particularly the Duo 230 (pictured).

Internally, the PowerBook 150 borrowed a number of components from Apple's PowerBook Duo line of subnotebook computers introduced earlier in 1993. Its logic board is a slightly modified version of that of the Duo 230. The form factor of the PowerBook 150's memory module is nearly identical to that of the PowerBook Duo, and it is capable of holding the contents of RAM while the battery is replaced, a feature previously exclusively to the PowerBook Duo. Apple slightly modified the design of the PowerBook Duo's memory module to include a specialized interposer, as well as a gray plastic brace to stabilize the module inside the PowerBook 150's chassis. As stock, the notebook is equipped with 4 MB of RAM, expandable to a maximum of 40 MB.

For connecting peripherals, the notebook features an RS-422 serial port and a HDI-30 SCSI connector. Unlike its predecessors, the PowerBook 150 lacks any connectors for outputting video and also lacks an Apple Desktop Bus port for ADB devices such as external keyboards and mice. Additionally absent is the Ethernet port of the PowerBook 500 series as well as a microphone jack, although it does have a headphone jack. It also did away with the flip-down port door on the rear of the case. Journalists noted that the reduced complement of ports on the PowerBook 150 compared to its predecessors was likely to reduce costs and influenced by its ties to the PowerBook Duo, which also lacked a full compliment of ports. Despite these reductions, the PowerBook 150 does feature the same proprietary slot for an optional internal fax modem as the PowerBook 145B. Aftermarket modems manufactured by Global Village were also sold for the PowerBook 150. Another aftermarket expansion board, which plugged into the fax modem slot to give the PowerBook 150 (as well as the PowerBook 100) a second serial port, was released by Sigma Seven Systems in mid-1995.

The PowerBook 150 originally shipped with System 7.1.1, as well as a host of bundled software. After September 1994, Apple shipped the notebook with System 7.5. Apple dropped support for the PowerBook 150 in Mac OS 8; the final operating system it supported was Mac OS 7.6.1.

== Technical issues ==
In November 1994, a bug was discovered in the PowerBook 150's modem subsystem that caused frequent system crashes, excessive battery drain while in sleep mode, and software packages using System 7.5's Communications ToolBox to be rendered inoperable. Apple issued a patch later that month correcting for the bug, as did Global Village.

The brace of the PowerBook 150's memory module presented compatibility issues with certain aftermarket memory modules featuring surface-mount capacitors between the RAM chips, as the resulting physical pressure can break these capacitors unless technicians cut small notches into the underside of the brace to ensure clearance. While some aftermarket memory modules integrate the interposer directly onto the circuit board, they still require this stabilization brace, which often necessitated purchasing Apple's proprietary PowerBook 150 Memory Adapter Kit just to acquire it. Installers also had to ensure that aftermarket modules were not too long, as excessive length can cause it to short out against the 68030's heat sink.

On most contemporary systems running Classic Mac OS, the process of formatting a HDD places a driver on the disk that facilitates reading and writing to the HDD. On the PowerBook 150, however, the disk driver is located in ROM, and the presence of a redundant driver on the disk will prevent the system from mounting the drive and making it available as a startup disk. Therefore, users have to use a specialized utility, Internal HD Format, to low-level format the drive and make it operable with the PowerBook 150. Drives formatted with any other Classic Mac OS utility, such as Drive Setup, are rendered inoperable with the PowerBook 150 until they are low-level formatted with a program such as Norton Utilities. The PowerBook 150 is also incapable of running in SCSI Disk Mode, which allows Macintosh systems to operate as an external HDD when connected to another Macintosh via a special SCSI cable.

== Release and reception ==
The PowerBook 150 was released on July 18, 1994. At an original starting price of US$1,449 (equivalent to $3,150 in 2025), it was the least expensive PowerBook at launch by a significant margin. When equipped with all the high-end options, the PowerBook 150 retailed for US$1,600 (equivalent to $3,476 in 2025), still a good bargain for the time. Apple aimed the PowerBook 150 at first-time buyers of notebooks, students, and small office and home office workers. In April 1995, Apple instituted a price cut to just over $1,000 at the low end. Towards the end of its lifespan, the PowerBook 150 dipped to $950, a price mark unparalleled by any other portable Macintosh for many years. The PowerBook 150 was succeeded by the PowerBook 190 in August 1995, the final entry in the PowerBook 100 line, which was discontinued in October 1, 1996. The PowerBook 150 was briefly sold alongside the 190 until it was formally discontinued on October 14, 1995. It retained the title of the cheapest launch price for any portable Macintosh until the mid-2000s, when newer models of the iBook G4 began retailing for under $1,000.

It's as if the 150's designers raided the leftovers shelf at the PowerBook warehouse and chose some components that are no longer state of the art but work just fine.

— Matthew Hawn, in Macworld

According to the author David Pogue, the PowerBook 150 won favor among the "student-and-starving-artist class" due to its low price, low weight, and performance. Among corporate buyers, however, the PowerBook 150 was greeted with a muted reception, owing to its antiquated 68030 processor, a perceived mediocre price–performance ratio, and the limited peripheral port selection.

Computer Shopper's Jeffrey Sullivan called it a "perplexing mix of impressive performance and cost-cutting omissions". He appreciated the 68030, finding it slightly more performant than both the Duo 230 that was the basis for the notebook as well as the higher-end PowerBook 180. He found the lack of a FPU socket a significant performance bottleneck and disliked the passive-matrix display. He ultimately praised the PowerBook 150 as a "the best of all possible worlds" for small office and home office workers: "a cheap and relatively fast notebook computer capable of handling most of their needs right out of the box".

Matthew Hawn of Macworld praised the breadth of the bundled software and like Sullivan found the PowerBook 150's 68030 speedy. He opined, however, that for the same price point as the PowerBook 150 a customer could buy a Wintel notebook computer and receive greater expandability, larger HDDs, and longer battery life. He also recommended budget-conscious users purchase reconditioned PowerBook 100 series units over the PowerBook 150, while those willing to spend several hundred dollars more invest in the PowerBook 520, which could be upgraded to a PowerPC processor. He concluded: "While the 150 is a solid machine, it isn't worth the premium price for a repackaging of older technology". Mac Home Journal concurred with Hawn, judging that a used PowerBook 165c cost roughly the same as the PowerBook 150 in 1995 while featuring nearly identical specifications with the addition of a color screen and the missing ports. PC Laptop Magazine's Cassandra Cavanah on the other hand lauded the PowerBook 150 over newer PowerBooks for retaining the original case design, which she deemed an "ergonomically correct design", as well as the trackball, which she found better than the trackpads of newer PowerBooks.

According to Leander Kahney in The Cult of Mac, the PowerBook 150 maintained a cult following in Japan long after its discontinuation in 1995. One fan club in the country, active as late as the mid-2000s, was dedicated to extending the technical longevity of the PowerBook 150 through playful competition among hardware modders.

== Timeline ==
Timeline of portable Macintoshes
See also: List of Mac models
