= PowerBook 100 series =

Line of laptops by Apple

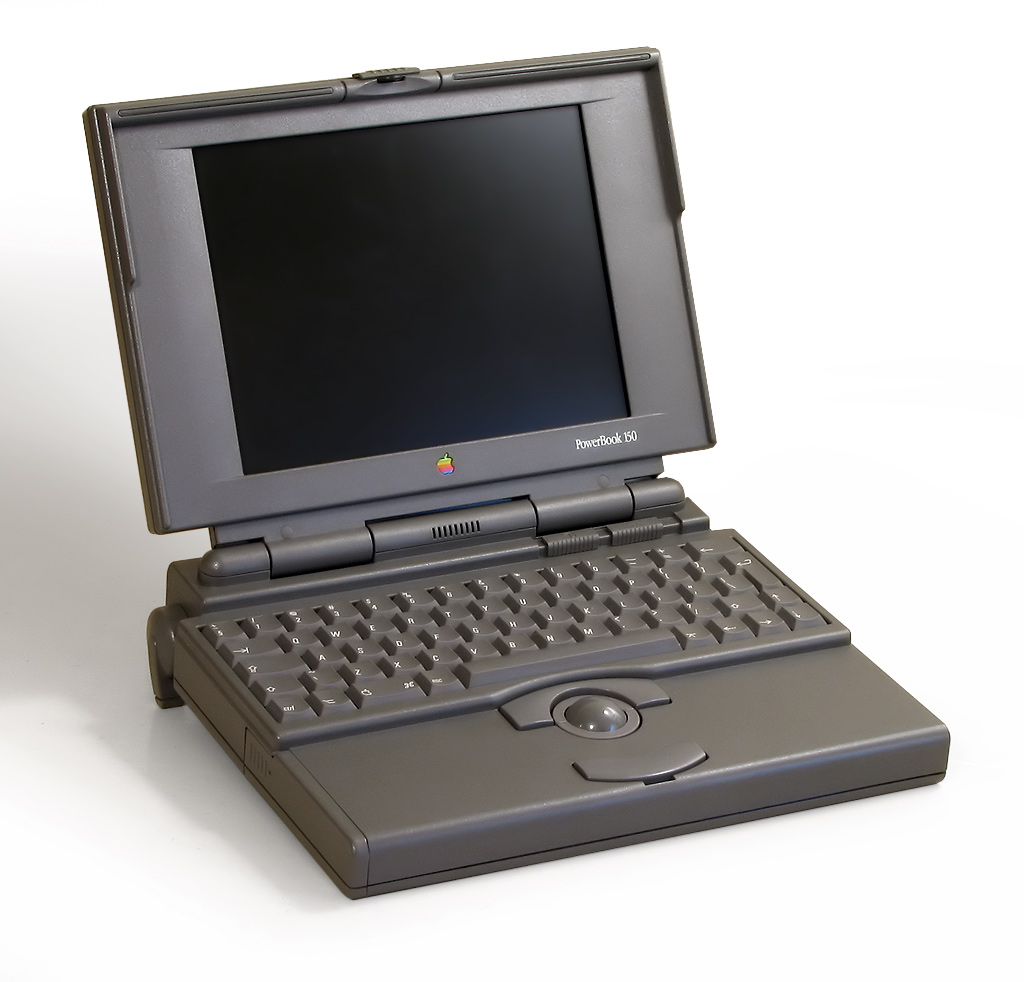
- The PowerBook 150, the second last model of the series
- Developer: Apple Computer
- Product family: PowerBook
- Type: Laptop
- Released: October 1991; 34 years ago
- Discontinued: September 1, 1996
- Predecessor: Macintosh Portable
- Successor: PowerBook 500 series
- Related: PowerBook Duo series

The PowerBook 100 series is a family of portable Macintosh computers produced by Apple Computer. Introduced in October 1991, the series was the first generation of the company's PowerBook line and initially consisted of the entry-level PowerBook 100, mid-range PowerBook 140, and high-end PowerBook 170.

Apple later expanded the series with models including the entry-level PowerBook 145, 145B, 150, and 190; the mid-range PowerBook 160 and 165c; and the high-end PowerBook 180 and 180c.

The original PowerBook models introduced a redesigned portable computer layout that placed the trackball in front of the keyboard, leaving space for palm rests on either side of the pointing device.

== Development ==
Beginning in 1990, Apple chief executive John Sculley personally oversaw development of the PowerBook project as part of a strategy to increase market share through lower-priced computers and faster product development. Following the commercial success of the Macintosh Classic and Macintosh LC, Sculley sought to apply the same approach to Apple's portable computers.

Sculley began the PowerBook project in 1990 with the goal of releasing the product within one year. John Medica managed engineering for the new laptop, Randy Battat led product marketing, and Neil Selvin headed the marketing effort. At the time, Toshiba and Compaq were among the leading manufacturers of portable computers, with models weighing less than 8 lb (3.6 kg). Apple's team designed the PowerBook to compete with these systems in size and weight.

Apple approached Sony in late 1989 for assistance designing and manufacturing the entry-level PowerBook 100, as Apple lacked sufficient engineering resources to complete the number of products planned for release in 1991. Sony engineers in San Diego and Japan developed the PowerBook 100 from Apple's specifications, largely based on the architecture of the Macintosh Portable. Sony completed the project in less than 13 months.

The mid-range PowerBook 140, and high-end PowerBook 170 were developed by the Apple Industrial Design Group between March 1990 and February 1991.

In 1991, notebook computers accounted for 13 percent of DOS PC sales and were the fastest-growing segment of the personal computer market. Apple sought to compete in this market by pricing the PowerBook competitively with DOS notebooks and introducing it on October 21, 1991, at the COMDEX computer expo in Las Vegas, a trade show traditionally focused on DOS-based personal computers, alongside two other models: the mid-range PowerBook 140 and high-end PowerBook 170.

Apple allocated a $1 million marketing budget to the PowerBook line. The company used most of the budget for a television advertisement created by Chiat/Day featuring former Los Angeles Lakers player Kareem Abdul-Jabbar using a PowerBook in an airline seat.

The PowerBook line exceeded Apple's sales expectations. The company had targeted sales of more than 200,000 units during the first year, and sold more than 100,000 units by January 1992 despite supply shortages. Revenue from PowerBook sales exceeded $1 billion during the first year after launch, and Apple became the worldwide leader in portable computer shipments.

=== Successors ===
The original PowerBook 100, 140, and 170 were replaced in 1992 by the PowerBook 145, 160, and 180, respectively. The PowerBook 160 and 180 added video output, allowing connection to external displays, projectors, and televisions, addressing a limitation of the original models. Apple also introduced the PowerBook Duo series in 1992 as a separate line of compact portable computers.

On February 10, 1993, Apple introduced the PowerBook 165c, the first PowerBook with a color display, followed by the high-end PowerBook 180c on June 7 with a better active-matrix color display. Apple also introduced the PowerBook 145B on June 7 as a lower-cost revision of the PowerBook 145.

The PowerBook 500 series was introduced in 1994 as Apple's mid-range and high-end portable computer line, while the PowerBook 100-series continued as an entry-level option with the PowerBook 150, released the same year. The PowerBook 150 was the final model to use the original PowerBook 100-series form factor and was marketed toward consumers and students.

The PowerBook 190, released in 1995, was the final model to use the 100-series designation but differed substantially from earlier models. It used the enclosure design of the PowerBook 5300 and a Motorola 68LC040 processor.

== Design ==
The PowerBook 100-series used an adaptation of Apple's Snow White design language, which had been used on the company's products since 1984. The portable computers used dark gray enclosures and raised ridges to mirror the lighter colors and recessed lines found on Apple's desktop computers. The ridges also improved grip on the portable computers when they were being carried by hand.

Robert Brunner, Apple's head of industrial design at the time, led the team responsible for the PowerBook's enclosure and trackball design. Brunner said the team designed the PowerBook "so it would be as easy to use and carry as a regular book". The dark granite gray color differed from the beige and platinum gray finishes used by many computers of the period.

The centrally positioned trackball allowed the computer to be operated by both left- and right-handed users. The keyboard was positioned toward the rear of the enclosure, leaving space for palm rests on either side of the pointing device. This layout differed from many portable computers of the period, which placed the keyboard closer to the user with unused space behind it.

== Reception and legacy ==
PC World named the PowerBook 100 series the 10th-greatest PC of all time in 2006. In 2005, US magazine Mobile PC named the PowerBook 100 series its choice as the greatest gadget of all time, ahead of the Sony Walkman and Atari 2600. The publication said they made the selection because of its size, ergonomics, and design that "turned notebook computers into mainstream products and ushered in the era of mobile computing." They also called Apple's decision to move the keyboard toward the screen the "greatest and most lasting innovation" for mobile computers as it provided a more natural resting place for the user's wrists.

== Technical specifications ==
Listed chronologically, by release date

Models		100	140	170	145	160	180	165c	145B	180c	165	150	190	190cs
Timetable	Introduced	October 21, 1991			August 3, 1992	October 19, 1992		February 10, 1993	June 7, 1993		August 16, 1993	July 18, 1994	August 28, 1995	
Timetable	Discontinued	September 3, 1992	August 3, 1992	October 19, 1992	June 7, 1993	August 16, 1993	May 16, 1994	December 13, 1993	July 18, 1994	March 14, 1994	July 18, 1994	October 14, 1995	April 1, 1996	September 1, 1996
Ordering info.	Gestalt ID	24	25	21	25/54	34	33	50	54	71	84	115	122	
Ordering info.	Order number	M0567	M0511	M1057	M4630	M4500	M4400	M4990	M1592	M7950	M1641	M2794	M3530	M4073
Ordering info.	Model	M1506	M5416	M5409	M5409	M4550	M4400	M4490	M5409	M7940	M4440	M2740	M3047	M3047
Performance	CPU	68000	68030										68LC040	
Performance	CPU speed	16 MHz		25 MHz			33 MHz		25 MHz	33 MHz				
Performance	FPU	None		68882	None		68882		—N/a	68882	None			
Performance	ROM	256 KB	1 MB										2 MB	
Performance	RAM	2 MB		4 MB	2 MB	4 MB								
Storage	Hard drive	20–40 MB SCSI	40–80 MB SCSI		80–160 MB SCSI	40–120 MB SCSI	80–120 MB SCSI	80–160 MB SCSI	80–120 MB SCSI	80–160 MB SCSI		120–250 MB IDE	500 MB IDE	
Storage	Floppy drive	External 1.44 MB SuperDrive (optional)	1.44 MB SuperDrive										Removable 1.44 MB SuperDrive	
Display	Size	9 in (230 mm)	9.8 in (250 mm)					8.9 in (230 mm)	9.8 in (250 mm)	8.4 in (210 mm)	9.8 in (250 mm)		9.5 in (240 mm)	10.4 in (260 mm)
Display	Colors	Monochrome				16 grays		256 colors	Monochrome	256 colors	16 grays	4 grays	16 grays	256 colors
Display	Method	Passive		Active	Passive		Active	Passive		Active	Passive			Passive
Display	Resolution	640 × 400								640 × 480	640 × 400	640 × 480		
Dimensions	H × W × D	1.8 × 11 × 8.5 in (46 × 279 × 216 mm)	2.25 × 11.25 × 9.3 in (57 × 286 × 236 mm)										2 × 11.5 × 8.5 in (51 × 292 × 216 mm)	
Dimensions	Weight	5.1 lb (2.3 kg)	6.8 lb (3.1 kg)					7.0 lb (3.2 kg)	6.8 lb (3.1 kg)				6.0 lb (2.7 kg)	6.3 lb (2.9 kg)
Operating systems	Original	6.0.8	7.0.1			7.1							7.5.2	
Operating systems	Maximum	7.5.5	7.6.1	7.5.5	7.6.1		7.5.5	7.6.1		7.5.5	7.6.1		8.1	
Refs														

== Timeline ==
Timeline of portable Macintoshes
See also: List of Mac models
