= PowerBook 190 =

Laptop computers by Apple Computer

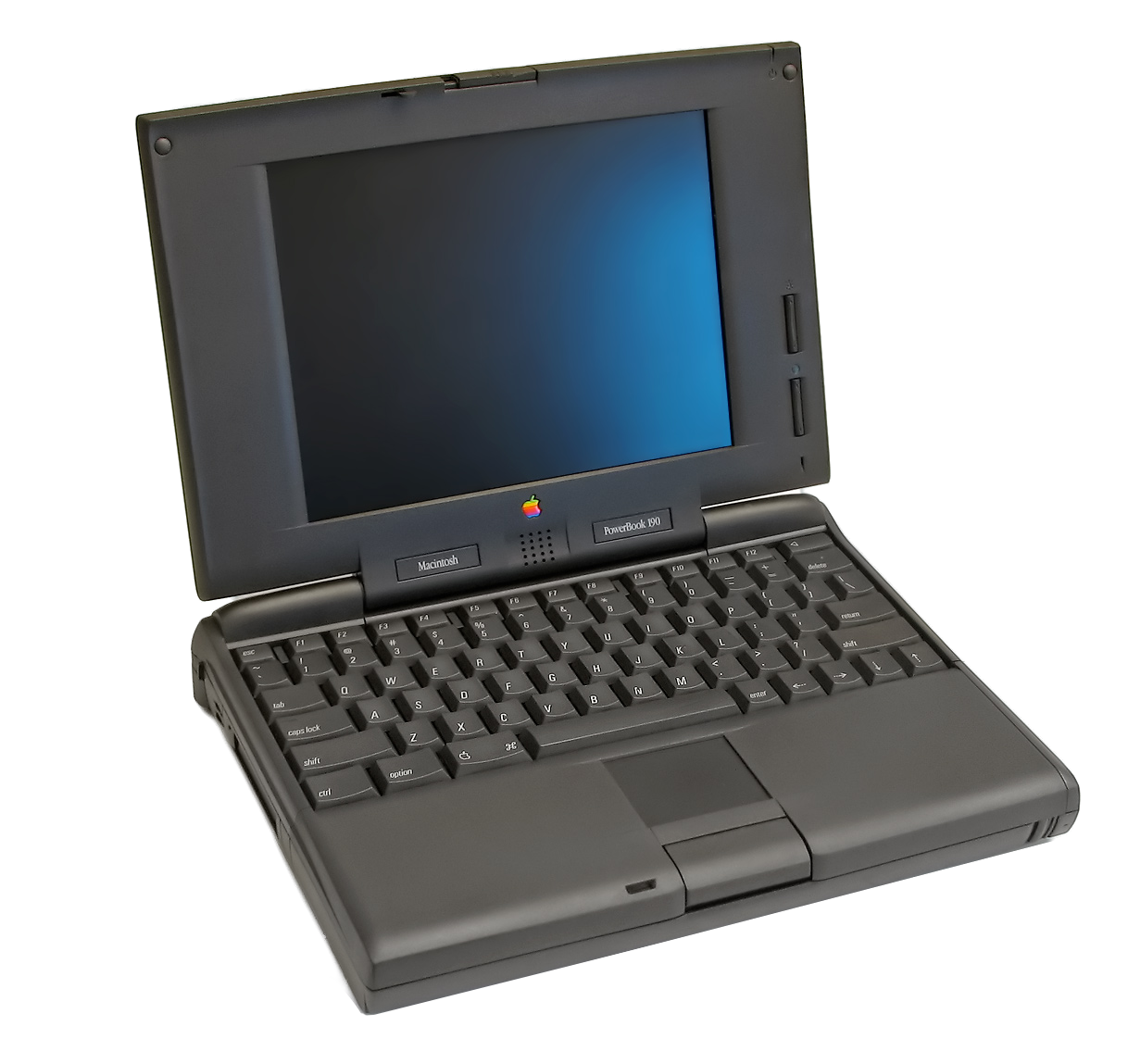
- Product family: PowerBook (100 series)
- Released: August 28, 1995
- Introductory price: 190: US$1,650 (equivalent to $3,500 in 2025); 190cs: US$2,300 (equivalent to $4,900 in 2025)
- Discontinued: October 1, 1996
- Operating system: System 7.5.2 – Mac OS 8.1
- CPU: Motorola 68LC040 @ 33 MHz
- Memory: 190: 4 MB, expandable to 36 MB; 190cs: 8 MB, expandable to 40 MB
- Dimensions: 11.5 × 8.5 × 2 in (292 × 216 × 51 mm)
- Weight: 190: 6.0 lb (2.7 kg); 190cs: 6.3 lb (2.9 kg)
- Predecessor: PowerBook 150
- Successor: PowerBook 1400
- Related: PowerBook Duo 2300; PowerBook 5300

The PowerBook 190 and PowerBook 190cs are laptop computers manufactured by Apple Computer as part of its PowerBook series. Introduced in August 1995, the two models differ primarily in their displays: the 190 has a 9.5-inch (240 mm) greyscale passive-matrix LCD, while the 190cs has a 10.4-inch (260 mm) dual-scan color LCD.

The PowerBook 190 was positioned as an entry-level machine below the subcompact PowerBook Duo 2300 and high-end PowerBook 5300 and was intended for users who did not require the performance of Apple's PowerPC-based PowerBooks. Contemporary reviews described it as a budget-oriented portable computer suitable for tasks such as word processing, Internet access, and general productivity.

== Hardware ==
Despite carrying a PowerBook 100 series name, 190 shares much of its design with the PowerBook 5300 series. Unlike the PowerBook 5300, which used PowerPC 603e processors, the PowerBook 190 used a Motorola 68LC040 processor running at 33 MHz. The PowerBook 190 and 190cs were the last Macintosh computers released by Apple to use a 68k processor. Apple offered a US$1,199 (equivalent to $2,500 in 2025) upgrade option that allowed the 190 to be upgraded with a PowerPC processor.

Unlike most of the earlier PowerBook 100 series models, it included a trackpad rather than a trackball and used IDE hard drives instead of SCSI. A 500 MB hard drive was standard, and the computer shipped with System 7.5.2.

The PowerBook 190 came standard with 4 MB of RAM and was priced at $1,650 (equivalent to $3,500 in 2025). The PowerBook 190cs came with 8 MB of RAM and was priced at $2,300 (equivalent to $4,900 in 2025).

The PowerBook 190 and 190cs, along with the PowerBook 5300 series, introduced two PC Card slots and a modular floppy drive that could be removed and replaced with another module, such as a second battery.

The PowerBook 190 and 190cs could be configured with an optional $49 (equivalent to $104 in 2025) infrared transceiver for short-range wireless communication and an $149 (equivalent to $315 in 2025) optional video port for connecting an external monitor, projector, or television.

Production of the PowerBook 190 ended in June 1996. The PowerBook 190cs remained available until October 1996, when it was replaced by the PowerBook 1400cs.

== Timeline ==
Timeline of portable Macintoshes
See also: List of Mac models
