= PowerBook Duo =

Line of subnotebooks manufactured and sold by Apple Computer

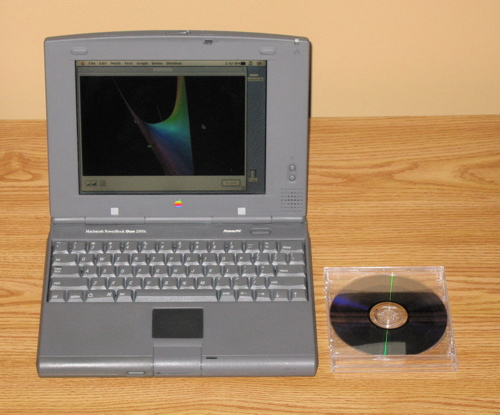
- Apple PowerBook Duo 2300c next to a standard CD jewel case, for size comparison
- Manufacturer: Apple Computer
- Product family: PowerBook
- Type: Subnotebook
- Released: October 19, 1992
- Discontinued: February 1, 1997
- Dimensions: 10.9 in × 8.5 in × 1.4 in (277 mm × 216 mm × 36 mm)
- Weight: 4.1 lb (1.9 kg)
- Predecessor: PowerBook 100
- Successor: PowerBook 2400

The PowerBook Duo is a line of subnotebook computers introduced by Apple Computer in 1992 and sold until 1997. Designed as a smaller companion to the PowerBook 100 series and the later 500 series, the line comprised seven models: the PowerBook Duo 210, 230, 250, 270c, 280, 280c, and 2300c.

Weighing 4.1 pounds (1.9 kg) and measuring 10.9 by 8.5 inches (280 by 220 mm), the PowerBook Duo was the smallest and lightest PowerBook of its time. To achieve its compact size, it omitted many built-in ports and expansion features, instead relying on optional docking stations to provide additional connectivity and functionality.

The PowerBook Duo line was discontinued in 1997 and replaced by the PowerBook 2400c, which incorporated more built-in functionality but did not support the Duo docking system.

== Features ==
The Duo line offered an ultraportable design that was light and functional for travel and expandable via its unique docking connector. Nonetheless, certain compromises were made to achieve this level of portability. The Duo series used an 88% of standard desktop-sized keyboard that was criticized for being difficult to type on. Likewise, the trackball was reduced in size from even that used on the PowerBook 100. The only usable port that came standard on the Duo was a dual printer or modem EIA-422 serial port.

There was a slot for an expensive, optional, internal 14.4 Express Modem and no provision for built-in Ethernet. This somewhat limited configuration meant the only way to move data in or out of the laptop in a stock configuration, without purchasing additional accessories, was via a relatively slow AppleTalk connection, which was not practical in the event of hard drive problems. Compensating for these limitations, the initial Duo offering provided for a considerably higher RAM limit of 24 MB (as compared to the 100 series' 14 MB), and a standard 80 MB hard drive (versus the 100's 40 MB drive). The debut year for the Duo only offered a passive matrix display on both the mid-level and high-end models, in contrast to the high-end of the PowerBook 100 series—the PowerBook 170 and 180 (in which the Duos shared the same processors). With their crisp active matrix displays, both were already in great demand over the lower-powered models with passive matrix displays. The following year, Apple replaced the Duo models with both an active matrix display and a color active matrix display, the latter becoming the de facto standard of the PowerBook line. The respective Duo models are easily differentiated by their display method and processor. All other features are identical.

== Duo 210 and Duo 230 ==
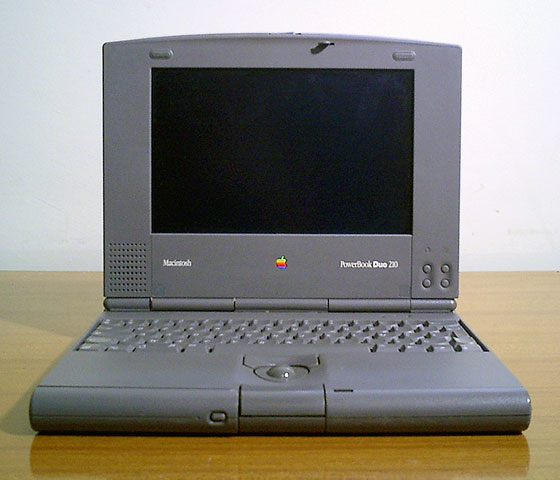
PowerBook Duo 230

The initial launch of the PowerBook Duo occurred in October 1992 with the Duo 210 and the Duo 230. The two machines were almost identical, with both having a 9.1-inch 4-bit grayscale passive matrix LCD and a Motorola 68030 (the Duo 210 at 25 MHz and the Duo 230 at 33 MHz). The Duo 210 came with an 80 MB hard drive, while the 230 had options for either 80 MB or 120 MB. Both came with 4 MB of RAM, upgradable to 24 MB via a DRAM card. The Duo 210 retailed for US$2,249, while the slightly faster 230 was US$2,609.

== Duo 250 and Duo 270c ==
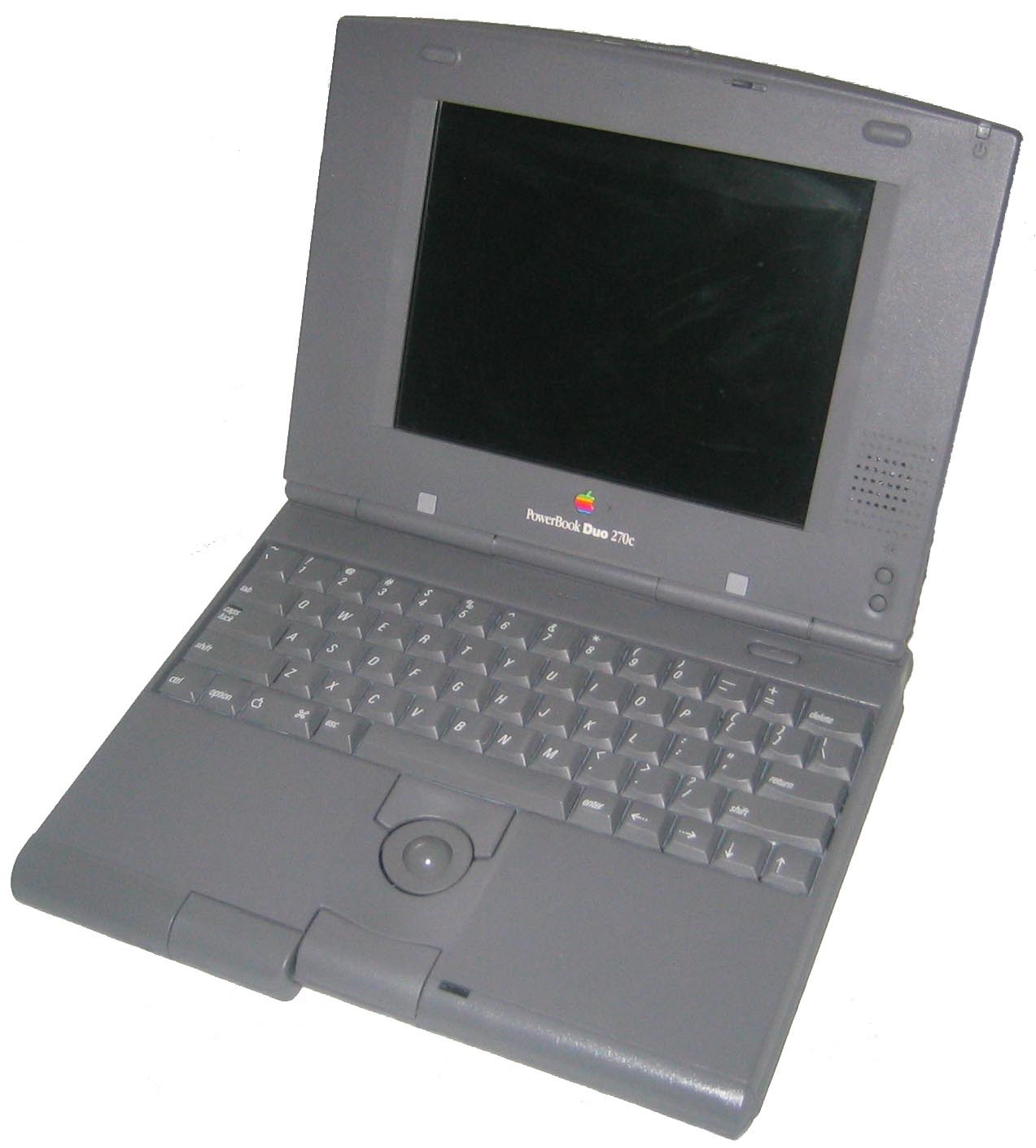
PowerBook Duo 270c

In October 1993, Apple released the Duo 250 and the 270c. The Duo 250 was essentially a 230 with a much improved active-matrix display and a 200 MB hard drive. The Duo 270c had a color active matrix display, but in addition to displaying 256 colors at 640 × 480, it could display 16-bit color (32,768 colors) at 640 × 400 – the first for any notebook computer. A redesigned motherboard included a Motorola 68882 math coprocessor and could accept up to 32 MB of RAM. Both the Duo 250 and 270c shipped with a new high capacity Type II nickel–metal hydride battery, which promised 25% more capacity.

== Duo 280 and Duo 280c ==
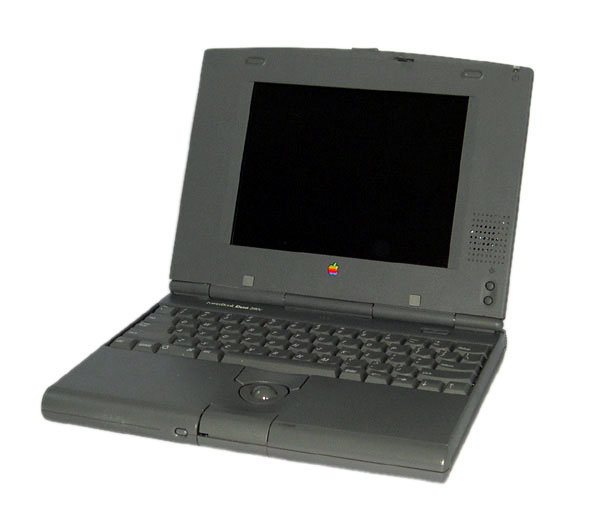
PowerBook Duo 280c

Released in May 1994, the Duo 280 and 280c were the Motorola 68LC040 replacements to the 250 and 270c. Both have the same displays as their 68030 counterparts, but the 33 MHz 68LC040 was substantially faster, and can support up to 40 MB of RAM. The 280c also shipped with a new Type III battery, which had 15% more capacity over the prior Type II.

== Duo 2300c ==
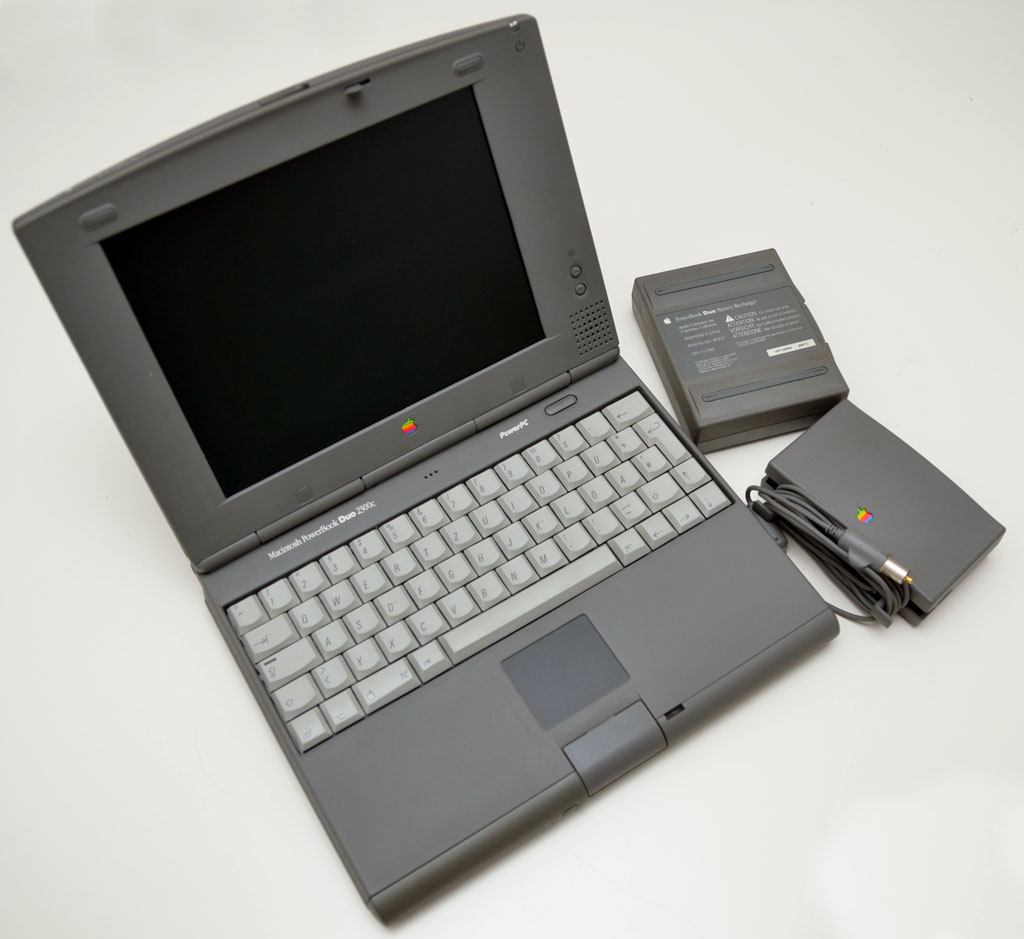
PowerBook Duo 2300c

In August 1995, Apple released the PowerPC-based Duo 2300c. Based on a 100 MHz PowerPC 603e, the 2300 had a larger 9.5-inch 16-bit active matrix display, a trackpad, and support for up to 64 MB of RAM. The 2300c retailed for US$3,700 for a configuration with 8 MB of RAM and a 750 MB hard disk, or US$4,700 for 20 MB of RAM and a 1.1 GB hard disk.

== Specifications ==
The 200–series Duos were powered by either Motorola 68030 or 68LC040 processors, ranging from 25 to 33 MHz. When Apple debuted its next-generation PowerPC processors in 1994, it took over a year for the first PowerPC Duo (the 2300c) to debut. The original PowerPC 601, like the original 68040 before it, produced too much heat and consumed too much power for Apple to use in any laptop. By the end of 1995, the more efficient PowerPC 603e had been developed, which was featured in the Duo 2300c and its full-size companion, the PowerBook 5300 series. The PowerPC 603e was designed for a 64-bit bus, but was engineered by Apple to run on an older 32-bit bus to maintain compatibility with the Duo Docks. This led to poor system and video performance.

According to Apple, all of these models are obsolete. (Note: Apple products that have been discontinued for 7 years and no longer receive hardware support or spare parts)

		210	230	250	270c	280	280c	2300c
Timetable	Introduced	October 19, 1992		October 21, 1993		May 16, 1994		August 28, 1995
Timetable	Discontinued	October 21, 1993	July 27, 1994	May 16, 1994		November 14, 1994	January 27, 1996	February 1, 1997
Model	Model number	M7777						
Model	Gestalt ID	29	32	38	77	102	103	118
Model	Apple part (Order/SKU) no.	M4161	M4195	M1933	M1752	M2797	M2329	M4220
Display	Size	9.1-inch grayscale passive matrix		9.1-inch grayscale active matrix	8.4-inch color active matrix	9.1-inch grayscale active matrix	8.4-inch color active matrix	9.5-inch color active matrix
Display	Colors	16			Thousands	16	Thousands	Thousands
Performance	Processor	68030			68030 with 68882 FPU	68LC040		PowerPC 603e
Performance	CPU speed	25 MHz	33 MHz					100 MHz
Performance	RAM (min.–max.)	4–24 MB			4–32 MB	4–40 MB		8–56 MB
Hard drive		80 MB	80 or 120 MB	200 MB	240 MB		320 MB	750 MB or 1.1 GB
OS	Shipped with	7.1		7.1.1				7.5.2
OS	Maximum	7.6.1				8.1		9.1

== Docking stations ==
PowerBook Duos omitted most standard ports, providing only an internal printer or modem serial port and an optional fax or modem card slot. Instead, they used a proprietary docking interface via a unique 156-pin Processor Direct Slot (PDS), which provided docks with direct access to the Duo's central processing unit (CPU) and data buses. Apple and third-party manufacturers offered several docking options.

=== Duo Dock ===
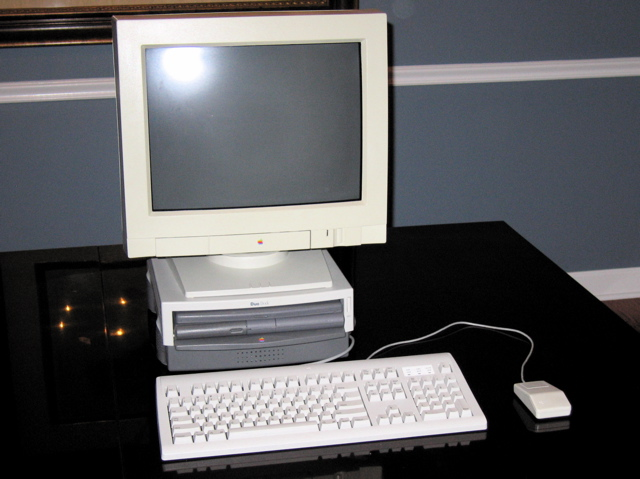
Duo Dock

The Duo Dock (model M7779) was the largest and most expensive docking option for the PowerBook Duo. It was introduced by Apple on October 19, 1992. Comparable products introduced in the same year included the LTE Lite Desktop Expansion Base from Compaq and IBM's 3550 Expansion Unit.

Unlike smaller docks, or port replicators that connected to the rear of laptops, these docks enclosed the laptop within the dock's housing using an internal sliding mechanism similar to that of a VHS recorder. The Duo Dock converted the PowerBook Duo into an AC-powered desktop system with standard ports. The dock's enclosure could support a CRT monitor placed on top of it. The Duo Dock included a floppy drive, two NuBus expansion slots, an optional floating-point unit (FPU), level 2 cache, a slot for additional VRAM, and space for a second hard drive.

The original Duo Dock was replaced by the Duo Dock II on May 16, 1994. It added AAUI networking and compatibility with the newer color-screen PowerBook Duo models. Apple also offered a replacement lid that allowed the thicker color models to be used with the original Duo Dock.

The Duo Dock II was succeeded by the Duo Dock Plus on May 15, 1995. It was otherwise identical to the Duo Dock II, but omitted the FPU and level 2 cache, which were incompatible with the 68LC040-based Duo 280 and the PowerPC-based Duo 2300c.

Although the laptop's display could not be opened while docked, additional NuBus video cards could be installed to support up to three external monitors.

Aging Duo Docks are prone to capacitor failures that affect the docking mechanism. This issue is colloquially known as the "Duo Dock Tick of Death".

=== Mini Dock ===
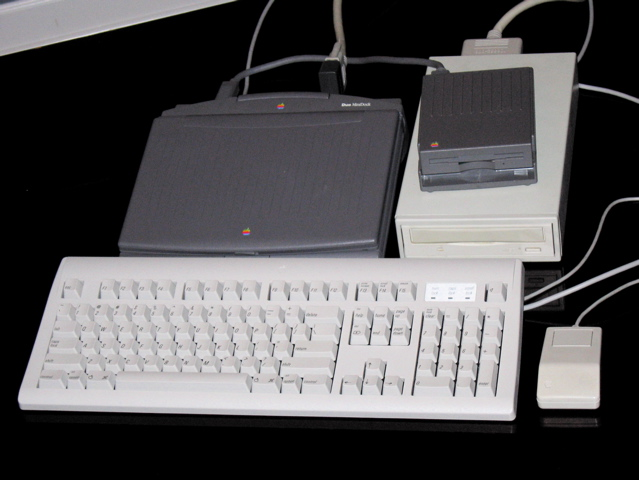
Mini Dock

The Mini Dock (model M7780) was a port expander for the PowerBook Duo and was popularly offered by many third-party manufacturers and Apple. When attached, the PowerBook Duo could be plugged into various standard desktop devices including SCSI, Apple Desktop Bus (ADB), serial, floppy disk, external speakers, and an external display. This type of dock also allowed the Duo's internal LCD and battery to be used. Third-party contributions to the Mini Dock added a variety of specialized custom options including Ethernet connectivity, NTSC and PAL video ports. The only significant difference between these docks and a full desktop configuration was the lack of custom PDS or NuBus expansion slots, which were included on all standard desktop Macs, a shortfall made up in task-specific third-party dock offerings.

=== Floppy Adapter ===
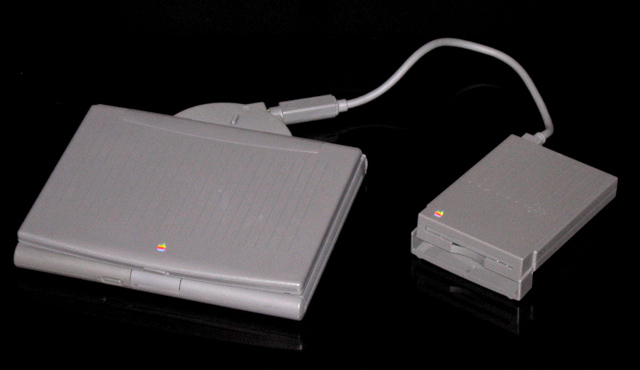
Micro Dock

The Floppy Adapter (model M7781, informally referred to as the Micro Dock) manufactured by both Apple and many third parties. Apple's official version provided a single ADB port and HDI-20 port to attach an external floppy drive.

Third-party examples include floppy, SCSI, video and Ethernet docks, each typically included one ADB port as well. This was the least expensive, and most basic of the docks. This type of dock allowed the Duo's internal LCD to be used as well, and could run on the Duo's internal battery for a reduced amount of time. Popular due to the minimal impact in accessories that must be carried with the Duo, they offered a practical alternative to emergency hard disk and software situations and task-specific needs.

== Design ==
The 2300 was the last Apple product to carry any vestige of the Snow White design language, which Apple had been phasing out since 1990. Drawing heavily upon improvements made to the original PowerBook 140 design, the Duo series continues many of the styling traits of the PowerBook 100, which is approximately equivalent in size and weight. In addition to the Snow White features, the Duo takes the 100's radius curves a step further along the display top, front, and sides, and which is also heavily mirrored in the various docks.

== PenLite ==
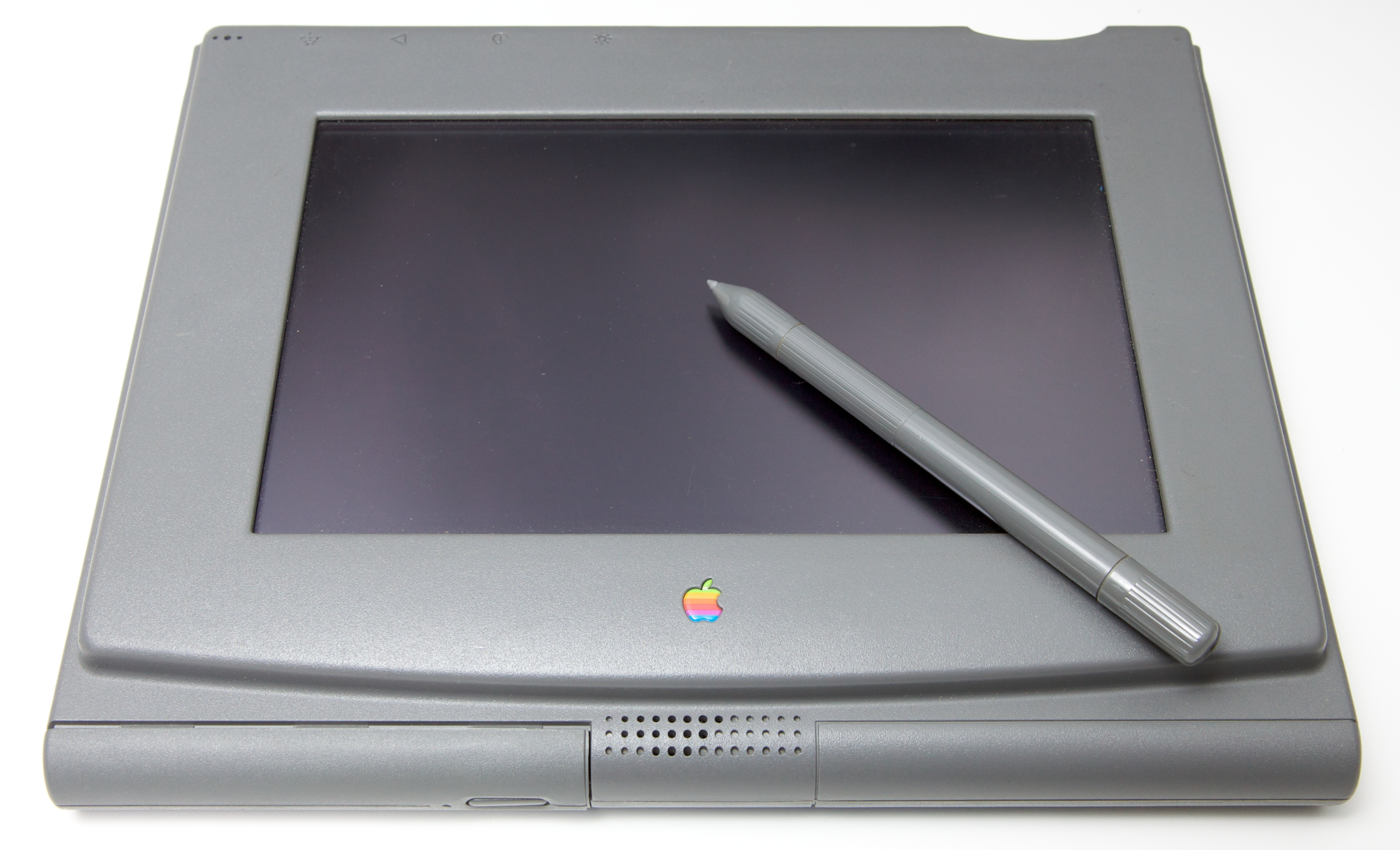
PenLite prototype

The PenLite was an early tablet computer prototyped by Apple Computer in 1993 around the same time as the Apple Newton. It was not a PDA but rather a complete computer. The project was canceled in 1994 due to its similarity to the Newton.

The PenLite was based on the PowerBook Duo and was meant to be a tablet-style addition, with a stylus as the input device. It was designed to be compatible with PowerBook Duo docks and accessories and ran the standard classic Mac OS, but with additional handwriting recognition and on-screen keyboard software.

While the project was cancelled, some of the engineering innovations lived on in other projects. The Rosetta handwriting recognition software was used to greatly improve handwriting recognition in Newton OS version 2, which had been widely panned before. The touchscreen technologies helped Apple introduce the touchpad on the PowerBook 500 series, becoming the industry standard.

== In popular culture ==
One of the most stylish and iconic of the laptops available at the time, the Duo was widely used in advertising, film and television.

- Sandra Bullock, starring as systems analyst Angela Bennett, prominently uses a PowerBook Duo 280c (and also a PowerBook 540c) in the movie The Net (1995).
- In the TV sitcom Home Improvement, a PowerBook Duo was used in the fifth episode of season 6 (episode 131: "Al's Video" – original air date: October 15, 1996) as Jill's new computer. Just as she gets some work done on it, Tim comes along and destroys it by playing a game.
- Anne Heche, playing Amy Barnes, a geologist and seismologist, uses a PowerBook Duo 280c in the movie Volcano (1997) to calculate the speed of lava flowing beneath the city streets.
- In the film Wag The Dog (1997), the President's team members, including Anne Heche and Dustin Hoffman among others, use several PowerBook Duo 280c.
- In the critically acclaimed TV sitcom NewsRadio (1994–1999), Dave Nelson used a PowerBook Duo almost exclusively for the first four seasons, the only exceptions being the first few episodes in which he used a PowerBook 100 series. In the fourth season (beginning in 1997), PowerBook Duos were also used prominently by Lisa Miller and occasionally by other characters. In the fifth season (beginning in 1998), all computers on the show were replaced with PowerBook G3s and a first-generation iMac.
- A complete PowerBook Duo system, including Dock, is featured prominently throughout seasons five through seven of Seinfeld.
- In the movie Hackers (1995), Kate Libby owns a PowerBook Duo 280c (with a 2300c logic board infamously remarked to have a "28.8 bps modem"; the 28.8 for the 2300 was never produced and remained a prototype only). She claims it has a "P6 chip". While people believed she was referring to the Intel Pentium Pro, it was actually a PowerPC 603e in the 2300 motherboard (which was referred to by Apple as the "P6" chip for marketing purposes). Dade Murphy is sent a clear-cased prototype 280c^{[1]} by Eugene "The Plague" Belford.
- Denzel Washington, playing Lieutenant Colonel Nathaniel Serling in Courage Under Fire (1996), drafts a letter using a PowerBook Duo 250.

== Timeline ==
Timeline of portable Macintoshes
See also: List of Mac models

== See also ==
- List of Mac models grouped by CPU type
- Docking station
