= PowerBook 140 =

Laptop by Apple

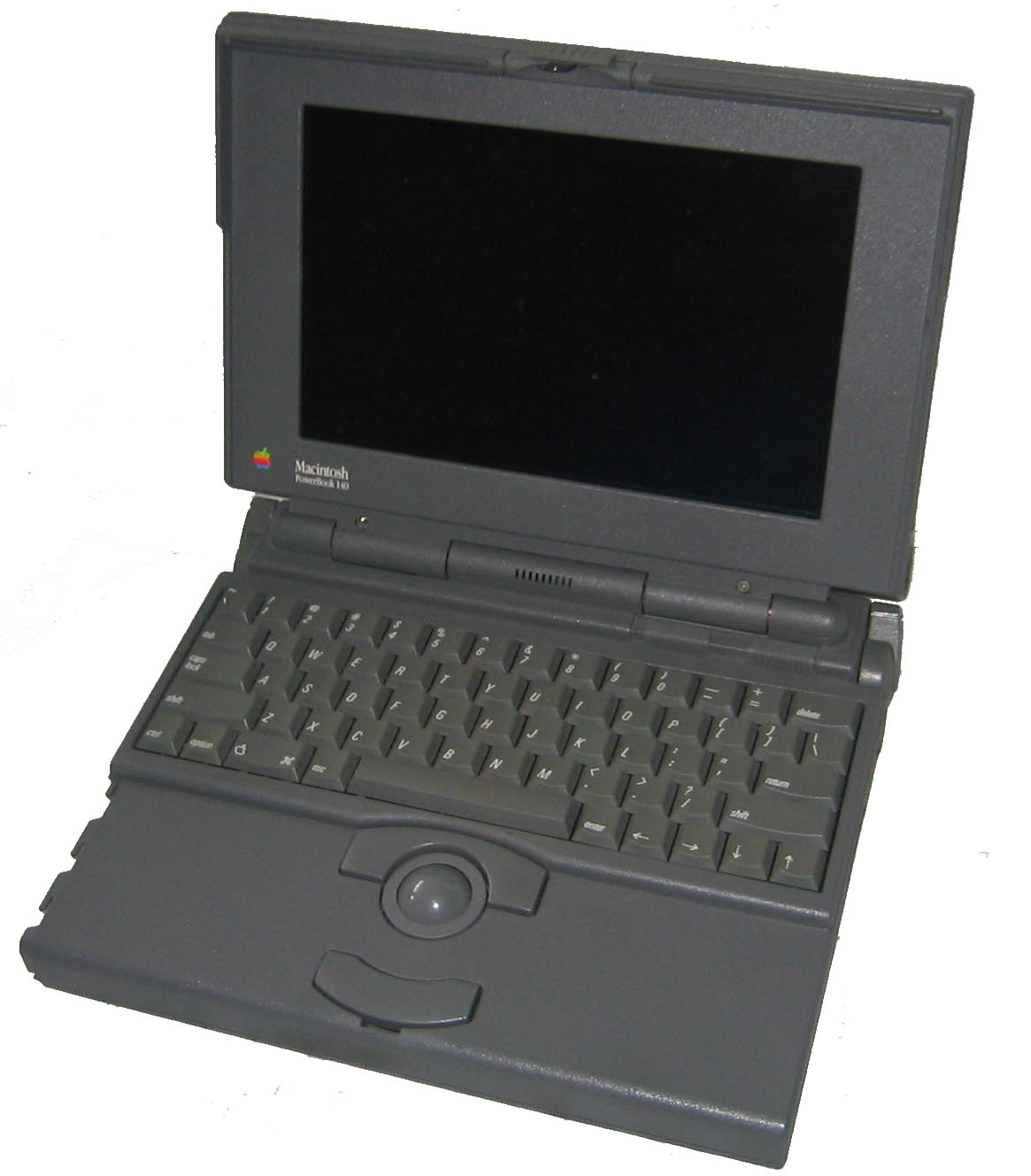
- Apple Macintosh PowerBook 140
- Developer: Apple Computer
- Product family: PowerBook (100 series)
- Type: Laptop
- Released: 140: October 21, 1991; 145: August 3, 1992; 145B: June 7, 1993
- Introductory price: 140: US$3,199 (equivalent to $7,562 in 2025); 145: US$2,149 (equivalent to $4,930 in 2025); 145B: US$1,649 (equivalent to $3,675 in 2025)
- Discontinued: 140: August 3, 1992; 145: June 7, 1993; 145B: July 18, 1994
- CPU: Motorola 68030; 140: @ 16 MHz; 145/145B: @ 25 MHz
- Memory: 140: 2 MB MB, expandable to 8 MB; 145/145B: 4 MB MB, expandable to 8 MB
- Display: 9.8-inch, 640 × 400 monochrome passive matrix LCD
- Weight: 6.8 lb (3.1 kg)
- Predecessor: 140: Macintosh Portable; 145/145B: PowerBook 100
- Successor: PowerBook Duo; PowerBook 150; PowerBook 160
- Related: PowerBook 100; PowerBook 170

PowerBook 140 is a notebook computer introduced by Apple in October 1991 as part of the first generation of the PowerBook line. It was positioned as the mid-range model between the low-end PowerBook 100 and high-end PowerBook 170. Like the PowerBook 170, it included an internal floppy disk drive, unlike the PowerBook 100. However, like the PowerBook 100, it used a passive-matrix LCD, a 16 MHz processor, and 2 MB of onboard RAM, compared with the PowerBook 170's active-matrix display, 25 MHz processor, and 4 MB of RAM. In 1992, the PowerBook 160 assumed the 140's role as Apple's mid-range notebook. The PowerBook 145, a revision of the PowerBook 140 with a faster 25 MHz processor and 4 MB of RAM, became Apple's entry-level notebook. In 1993, it was succeeded by the lower-priced PowerBook 145B.

== Design ==
The PowerBook 140 was introduced alongside the entry-level PowerBook 100 and high-end PowerBook 170. Unlike the PowerBook 100, which was miniaturized by Sony from the Macintosh Portable, the PowerBook 140 and 170 were designed entirely by Apple. As a result, they were the first notebook computers designed in-house by Apple.

The PowerBook 140 was designed by Gavin Ivester of the Apple Industrial Design Group. Codenames for this model are Tim LC and Leary.

Intended as a replacement for the Macintosh Portable, the PowerBook 140 shared the same basic design as the PowerBook 170 but omitted several features to reduce cost. The most visible difference was its 10 in (25 cm) monochrome passive matrix display, compared with the higher-quality active-matrix screen used in the 170. The 140 also used a slower 16 MHz Motorola 68030 processor, lacked a floating-point unit (FPU), and shipped with a 20 MB hard drive instead of the 170's 40 MB drive.

The PowerBook 140 shipped with System 7.0.1, which added support for the PowerBook line's power management and hardware features. Because memory prices were high at the time, the computer included only 2 MB of RAM soldered to the logic board, which some reviewers considered insufficient for System 7. As localized versions of System 7 were not yet available in all markets, Apple released a modified Japanese version of System 6.0.7 with PowerBook support. That version was later unofficially adapted for use on the PowerBook 140 in other regions.

== PowerBook 145 ==
The PowerBook 145 was an updated version of the PowerBook 140, featuring a 25 MHz processor instead of the 140's 16 MHz processor, a standard 40 MB hard drive instead of a 20 MB unit, and a 2 MB RAM module in addition to the 2 MB soldered to the logic board. Its specifications were similar to those of the earlier high-end PowerBook 170, and its performance was approximately 35 percent faster than that of the PowerBook 140. It also added the ability to automatically enter sleep mode or shut down when the display was closed. The model's codename was Colt 45.

Although derived from the PowerBook 140, the PowerBook 145 replaced the PowerBook 100 as Apple's entry-level model when the PowerBook 160 succeeded the 140 in the mid-range position. It was replaced by the PowerBook 145B in June 1993.

Macworld wrote that the 145 occupied an awkward position in the lineup because its list price of US$2,149 (equivalent to $4,930 in 2025) was only slightly lower than that of the more capable PowerBook 160.

== PowerBook 145B ==
The PowerBook 145B was a revision of the PowerBook 145 that moved all 4 MB of RAM onto the logic board, leaving the memory expansion slot available. It used the space occupied by the math coprocessor in the PowerBook 170. The standard configuration included a 40 MB hard drive and had a list price of US$1,649 (equivalent to $3,675 in 2025). Its codename was Pikes Peak.

To reduce costs, the PowerBook 145B did not include a complete set of system floppy disks. Instead, it shipped with a bootable floppy disk containing backup and restore utilities, an approach Apple also used on the entry-level Performa line.

The PowerBook 145B was replaced by the PowerBook 150 in mid-1994 as Apple's entry-level portable computer.

== Specifications ==
According to Apple, all of these models are obsolete. (Note: Apple products that have been discontinued for 7 years and no longer receive hardware support or spare parts)

Model	140	145	145B
Processor	Motorola 68030		
Clock speed	16 MHz	25 MHz	
RAM	2 MB on board, expandable to 8 MB	2 MB on board, 4 MB installed, expandable to 8 MB	4 MB on board, expandable to 8 MB
ROM	1 MB		
Hard disk	20, 40 or 80 MB	40 or 80 MB	
Floppy disk	1.44 MB SuperDrive		
Systems supported	System J-6.0.7.1/7.0.1–Mac OS 7.6.1		System 7.1–Mac OS 7.6.1
I/O	ADB (1 port), SCSI (1 port, HDI30 connector), Serial (2 ports); Optional built-in modem		
Screen	Passive matrix, 1-bit monochrome, 640 × 400 resolution		
Ref.			

== Timeline ==
Timeline of portable Macintoshes
See also: List of Mac models
