= PowerBook 160 =

Laptop by Apple

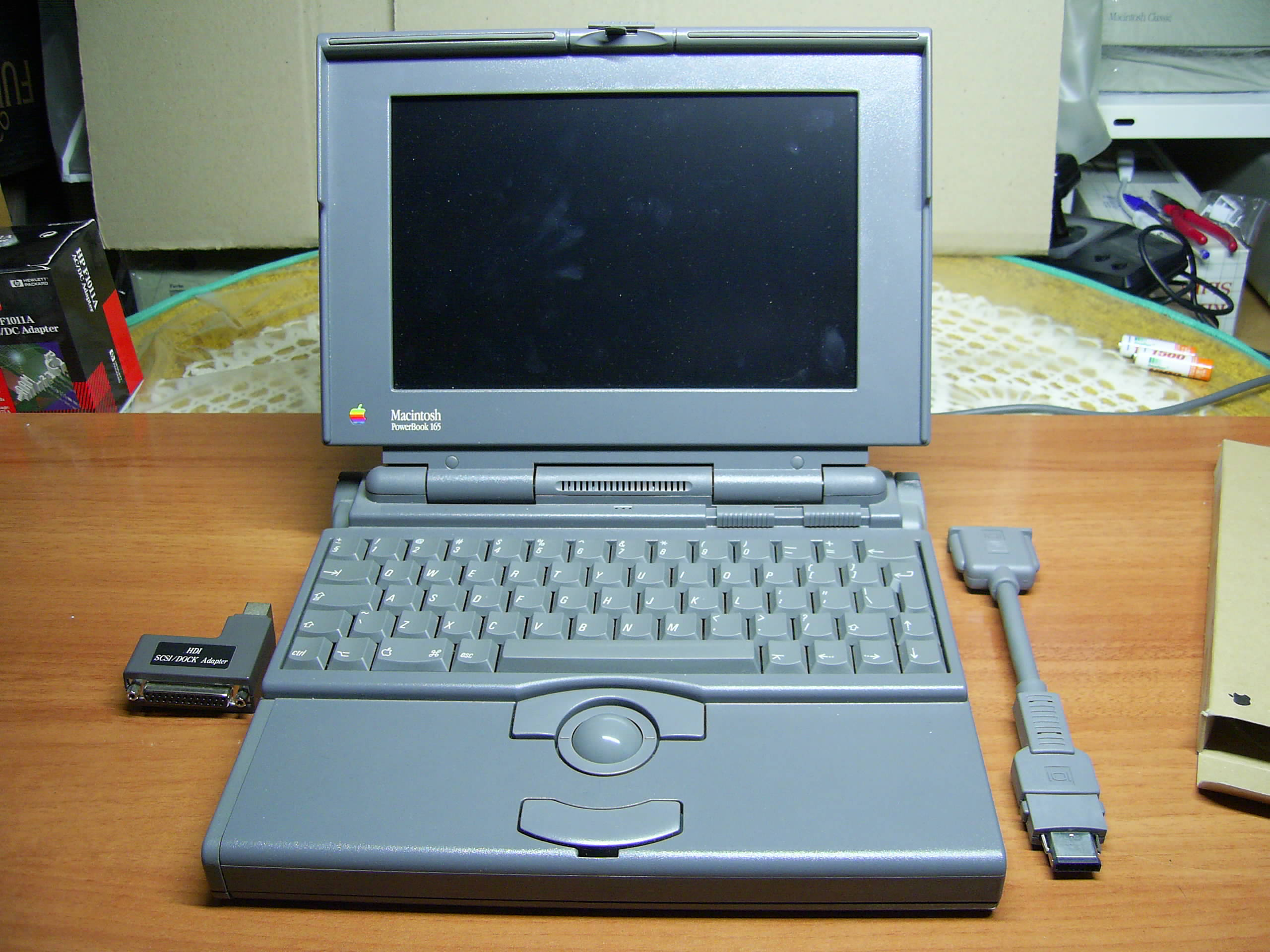
- PowerBook 165 with SCSI (left) and video (right) adapters
- Product family: PowerBook (100 series)
- Released: 160: October 19, 1992; 165c: February 10, 1993; 165: August 16, 1993
- Introductory price: 160: US$2,430 (equivalent to $5,600 in 2025); 165c: US$3,400 (equivalent to $7,600 in 2025); 165: US$1,970 (equivalent to $4,400 in 2025)
- Operating system: System 7.1–Mac OS 7.6.1
- CPU: Motorola 68030; 160: @ 25 MHz; 165c/165: @ 33 MHz
- Memory: 4 MB, expandable to 14 MB
- Predecessor: PowerBook 140
- Successor: PowerBook 520/520c
- Related: PowerBook 145/145B; PowerBook 180

The PowerBook 160 is a notebook computer introduced by Apple in October 1992 as part of the second generation of the PowerBook line. It was positioned as the mid-range model between the entry-level PowerBook 145/145B and the high-end PowerBook 180. It featured a 25 MHz Motorola 68030 processor, video output, support for up to 14 MB of RAM and used a passive-matrix display. In 1993, Apple introduced the PowerBook 165, which replaced the 160 with a faster 33 MHz processor and a larger standard hard drive, and the PowerBook 165c, which added a passive-matrix color display and a Motorola 68882 floating-point unit.

== Basic features ==
Its case design is the same as that of the PowerBook 180, but it shipped with the less powerful 25 MHz Motorola 68030 CPU and no FPU, identically to the low-end 145. However, the PowerBook 160 came with a 9.8 in (250 mm) (diagonal) passive matrix LCD screen, which for the first time was capable of displaying 4-bit grayscale. The 160 and the 180 were the first PowerBooks to add an external color video port like the Macintosh Portable before it, as well as increasing the maximum RAM to 14 MB. Both PowerBooks introduced a new power saving feature which allowed their processors to run at a slower 16 MHz rate, the same speed as the original 140. The PowerBook 160 had a 40MB SCSI hard disk drive, configurable to 80 or 120MB.

The PowerBook 160 was discontinued on August 16, 1993, when it was replaced by the PowerBook 165.

== PowerBook 165c ==
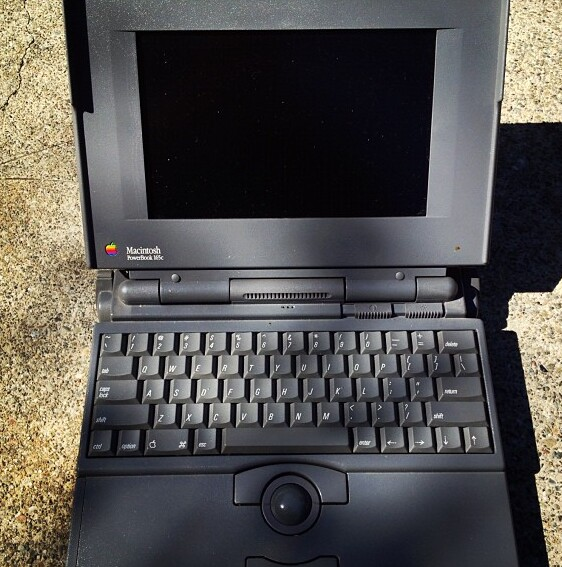
PowerBook 165c

Introduced on February 10, 1993, the PowerBook 165c was Apple's first laptop with a color display. Internally, it was largely identical to the high-end PowerBook 180, including using its 68882 FPU, but with a passive-matrix color LCD manufactured by Sharp capable of displaying 256 colors. The display measured 8.9 inches (230 mm) diagonally, compared with the 9.8-inch (250 mm) monochrome display used by the PowerBook 165 and 180. The standard configuration included an 80 MB hard drive and had a list price of US$3,399 (equivalent to $7,576 in 2025).

The color display required a redesigned enclosure, making the computer approximately 1.2 millimeters (0.047 in) thicker and increasing its weight to 7.0 lb (3.2 kg), compared with 6.8 lb (3.1 kg) for the PowerBook 180.

Contemporary reviews praised Apple's introduction of a color PowerBook but criticized the passive-matrix display for ghosting and limited viewing performance. Both Macworld and MacUser concluded that users who wanted a color notebook would be better served by waiting for an active-matrix model, which Apple introduced later that year as the PowerBook 180c.

Apple discontinued the PowerBook 165c on December 13, 1993.

== PowerBook 165 ==
Introduced on August 16, 1993, the PowerBook 165 replaced the 160. It adopted most of the improvements introduced with the 165c, including a 33 MHz Motorola 68030 processor and a larger standard hard drive, but retained the 160's monochrome display and omitted the FPU, allowing Apple to offer it at a lower price.

It was among the last PowerBooks to retain the original 100-series architecture and the last Apple laptop to include separate printer and modem serial ports. Apple discontinued the PowerBook 165 on July 18, 1994.

== Specifications ==
According to Apple, all of these models are obsolete. (Note: Apple products that have been discontinued for 7 years and no longer receive hardware support or spare parts)

| Model | PowerBook 160 | PowerBook 165 | PowerBook 165c |
|---|---|---|---|
| Gestalt ID | 34 | 84 | 50 |
| Processor | Motorola 68030 | | |
| Clock speed | 25 MHz | 33 MHz | |
| FPU | None | | Motorola 68882 |
| RAM | 4 MB on board expandable to 14 MB | | |
| ROM | 1 MB | | |
| Hard disk | 40, 80, or 120 MB | 80 or 160 MB | 80, 120, or 160 MB |
| Floppy disk | 1.44 MB Superdrive | | |
| Systems supported | System 7.1–Mac OS 7.6.1 | | |
| Screen | 9.8" grayscale passive matrix, 640 × 400 | | 8.9" color passive matrix, 640 × 400 |
| Colors | 16 | | 256 |
| Dimensions (H × W × D) | 2.25 in × 11.25 in × 9.3 in (57 mm × 286 mm × 236 mm) | | 2.29 in × 11.25 in × 9.3 in (58 mm × 286 mm × 236 mm) |
| Weight | 6.8 lb (3.1 kg) | | 7.0 lb (3.2 kg) |
| Ref. | | | |

== Timeline ==
Timeline of portable Macintoshes
See also: List of Mac models
