= Addressing scheme =

Addressing scheme could refer to:

- Addressing schemes for describing the location of buildings
- Display addressing scheme for digital displays
