= PowerBook 170 =

Laptop by Apple

- Apple Macintosh PowerBook 170
- Developer: Apple Computer
- Product family: PowerBook
- Type: Laptop
- Released: October 21, 1991; 35 years ago
- Introductory price: US$4,599 (equivalent to $10,870 in 2025)
- Discontinued: October 19, 1992
- CPU: Motorola 68030 @ 25 MHz
- Memory: 4 MB, expandable to 8 MB
- Display: 9.8-inch, 640 × 400 monochrome active matrix LCD
- Predecessor: Macintosh Portable
- Successor: PowerBook 180
- Related: PowerBook 100; PowerBook 140

PowerBook 170 is a notebook computer introduced by Apple in October 1991 as part of the first generation of the PowerBook line. It was positioned as the high-end model above the entry-level PowerBook 100 and mid-range PowerBook 140. While it shared the same case design as the PowerBook 140, it featured a faster 25 MHz Motorola 68030 processor, a Motorola 68882 floating-point unit (FPU), an significantly better quality active matrix display, 4 MB of on-board memory and a larger hard drive. Like the PowerBook 140, it included an internal floppy disk drive. In 1992, it was succeeded by the PowerBook 180.

== Features ==
The PowerBook 170 shared the same enclosure and overall design as the PowerBook 140, but was equipped with higher-end components. It featured a 25 MHz Motorola 68030 processor, a Motorola 68882 floating-point unit (FPU), a monochrome active-matrix display, and a 40 MB hard drive. These specifications made it the most powerful model in Apple's original PowerBook lineup.

Like the other first-generation PowerBooks, the 170 was introduced with System 7.0.1, which provided support for the new hardware and power-management features. Although the computer shipped with 4 MB of RAM installed, only 2 MB was soldered directly to the logic board, with the remaining memory provided by an expansion card. Contemporary reviewers noted that memory configurations below 4 MB could limit the usability of System 7.

Because localized versions of System 7 were not yet available in all markets, Apple released a modified version of the Japanese KanjiTalk 6.0.7 operating system with support for the PowerBook line. Known as J-6.0.7.1, it was later adapted by users to run on standard PowerBook 140 and 170 systems, allowing continued use of System 6 on the new hardware.

== Design ==
The PowerBook 170 was introduced alongside the low-end PowerBook 100 and mid-range PowerBook 140. The PowerBook 140 and 170 were designed entirely by Apple's internal design team, while the PowerBook 100 was adapted by Sony from the earlier Macintosh Portable. As a result, the 140 and 170 were the first notebook computers designed entirely by Apple.

The PowerBook 170 retained many of the capabilities of the Macintosh Portable while introducing a smaller and lighter notebook form factor. Unlike the Portable, however, it lacked internal expansion slots and an external video connector. Support for external displays was later added with its successor, the PowerBook 180.

== Specifications ==
- Processor: Motorola 68030 CPU and Motorola 68882 FPU, both running at 25 MHz
- RAM: 2 MB soldered to the motherboard, shipped with 4 MB total installed; expandable to 8 MB
- ROM: 1 MB
- Hard drive: 40–80 MB
- Floppy disk: 1.44 MB SuperDrive
- Operating systems: System J-6.0.7.1/System 7.0.1 through Mac OS 7.6.1
- ADB: 1 port
- Serial: 2 ports
- Modem: Optional (used for this model's expansion port)
- Display: 9.8-inch monochrome active-matrix LCD, 640 × 400 resolution

== Timeline ==
Timeline of portable Macintoshes
See also: List of Mac models
