= Display addressing scheme =

Scheme to set or maintain the state of a pixel in a display device

There are three different addressing schemes for display devices: direct, matrix, and raster. The purpose of each scheme is to set (or maintain) the state of a pixel to either black/white or, more commonly, a grayscale level.

== Direct addressing ==
A direct-driven, or directly addressed display runs individual control signals to each pixel. This allows the state, whether on/off or grayscale, to be set and maintained on each pixel. For a screen size of m×n pixels, this scheme would require m×n control signals in grayscale. This is generally considered to be inefficient, and is technically impossible for modern displays—for example, 1920 x 1080 pixels and an RGB system (3 times as many control signals needed) results in ~6 million control lines.

== Matrix addressing ==
A matrix-driven, or matrix addressed display runs control signals only to the rows (lines) and columns of the display. (See also: Display matrix) For a screen size of m×n pixels, this scheme requires m+n control signals in grayscale, or three times as many in RGB.

To address all pixels of such a display in the shortest time, either entire rows or entire columns have to be addressed sequentially. As many images are shown on a 16:9 aspect ratio, the sequential addressing is typically done row-by-row (i. e. line-by-line). In this case, fewer rows than columns have to be refreshed periodically.

Passive matrix addressing is used with the help of persistence of vision of the (usually human) eye so the cell need not be bistable. Persistence of vision is used in simpler, slower changing displays with relatively few picture elements such as clocks. In active matrix addressing, some sort of capacitor (external to the cell proper) is used to maintain the state of the cell. When the electro-optical property of cells itself is bistable, passive matrix addressing without external capacitor can be implemented.

Active matrix displays are able to have higher resolution, contrast, and colors, but passive matrix displays can often be cheaper.

== Raster addressing ==
A raster addressed display (e.g., a CRT) works by scanning across the entire display in sequence while modulating control signal to activate each pixel as it is scanned. This display uses persistence of the pixel element (e.g., phosphor) to maintain the pixel state until the scan can visit that pixel again. There are only three control signals required for this to work: a horizontal scan control signal, a vertical scan control signal, and an intensity control signal. Timing between these signals is very important, else the image on the screen will show artifacts.
