= PowerBook 180 =

Laptop by Apple Computer

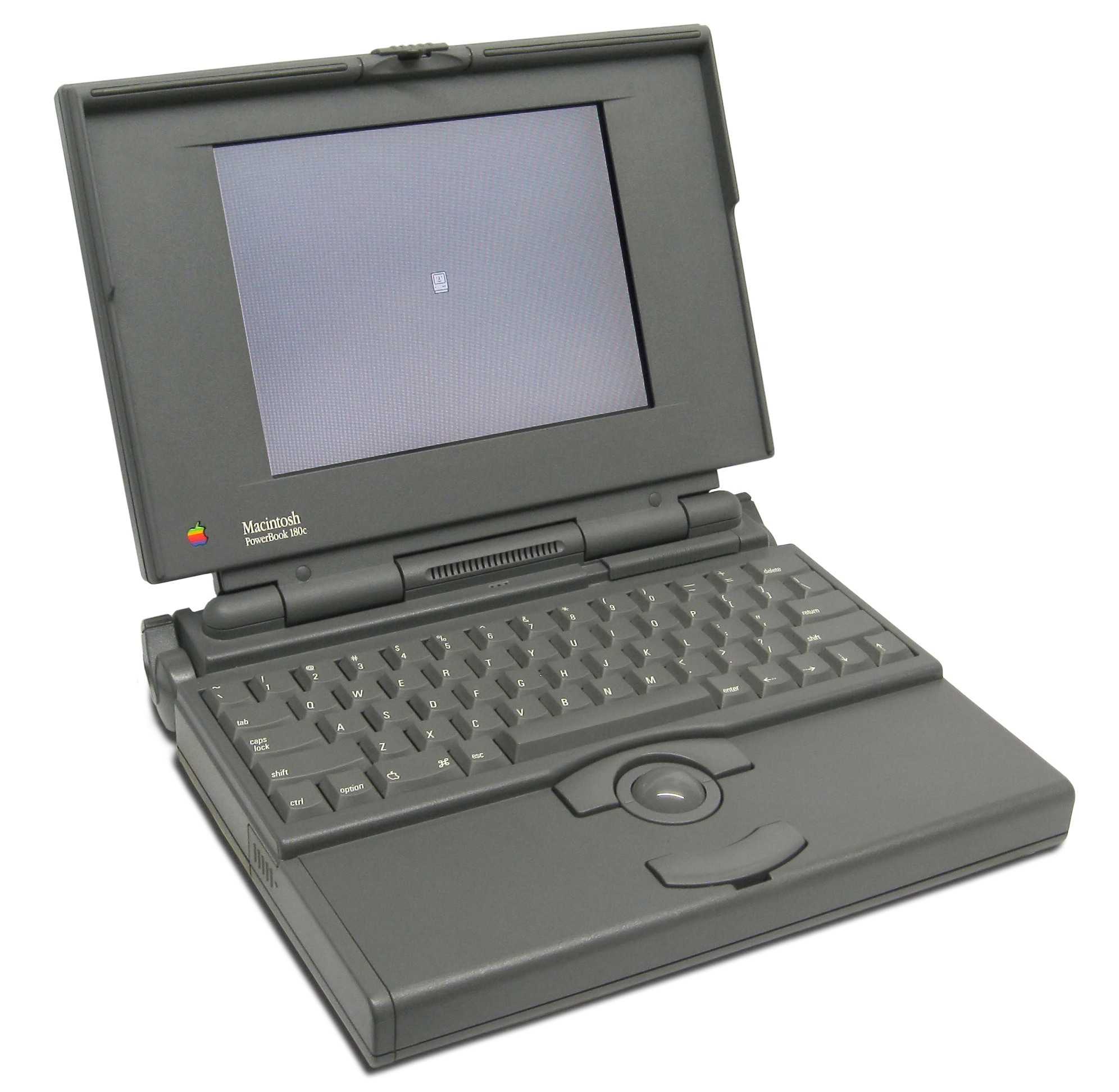
- PowerBook 180c
- Developer: Apple Computer
- Product family: PowerBook (100 series)
- Type: Laptop
- Released: October 19, 1992
- Introductory price: US$3,870 (equivalent to $8,879 in 2025)
- Discontinued: May 1, 1994
- Operating system: System 7.1 – Mac OS 7.6.1
- CPU: Motorola 68030 @ 33 MHz
- Memory: 4 MB, expandable to 36 MB

The PowerBook 180 is a portable computer introduced by Apple Computer on October 19, 1992, as part of the second generation of the PowerBook line. It was the high-end model, replacing the PowerBook 170, while the PowerBook 160 succeeded the PowerBook 140 as the mid-range model. The PowerBook 180 retained the 170's active-matrix display and floating-point unit, while increasing the processor speed to 33 MHz and adding external video output. In 1993, Apple introduced the PowerBook 180c, which retained the PowerBook 180's internal hardware while replacing its monochrome display with a color LCD.

== PowerBook 180 ==
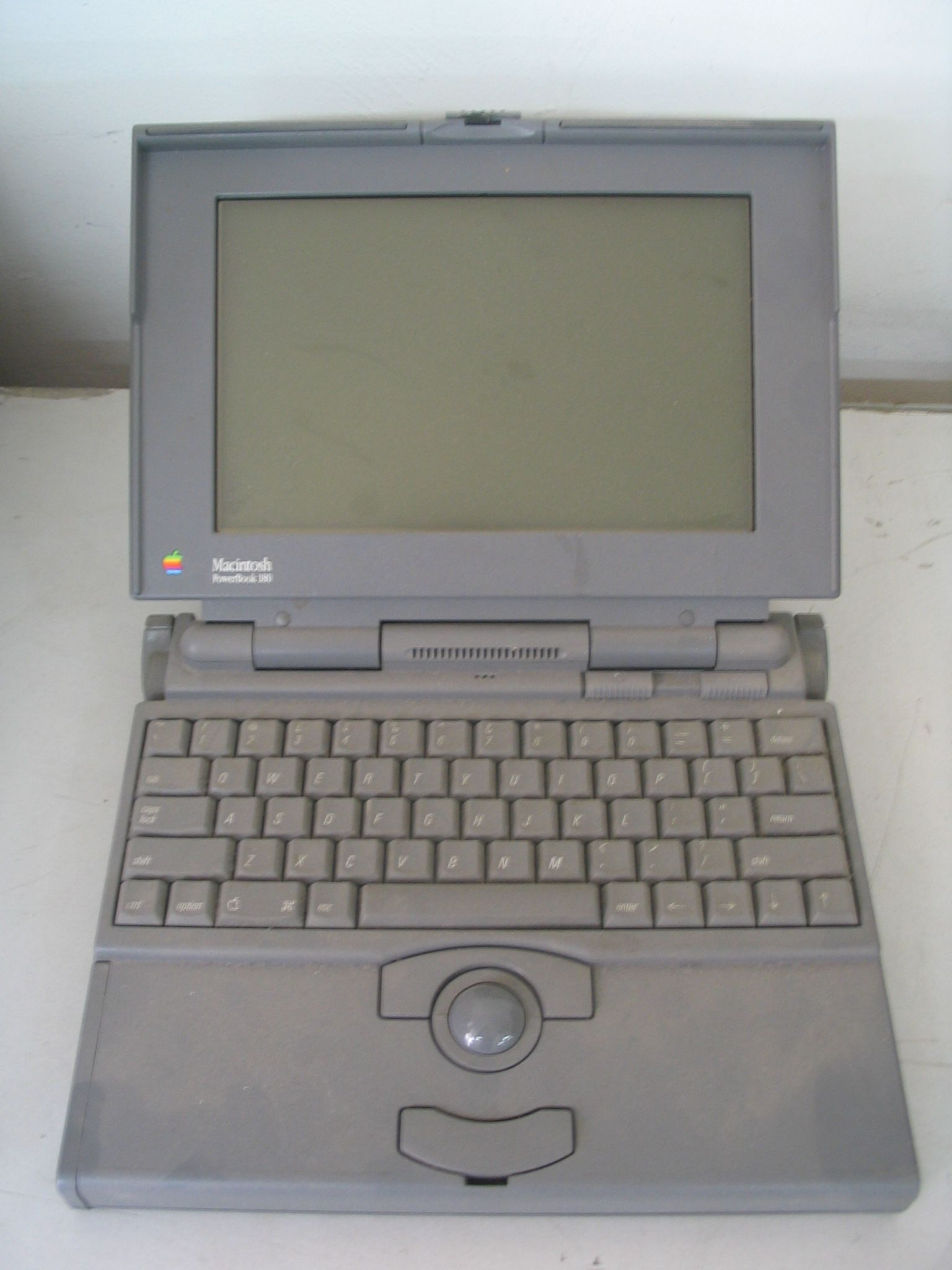
PowerBook 180

Introduced on October 19, 1992, the PowerBook 180 retained the general design of the PowerBook 170 while increasing the processor speed to 33 MHz and doubling the standard hard drive capacity to 80 MB. It also improved the display by adding 4-bit grayscale support, allowing it to display 16 shades of gray on its 9.5-inch active-matrix LCD, compared with the monochrome display used by the PowerBook 170. Standard features included a 1.44 MB SuperDrive floppy drive, a trackball positioned below the keyboard, folding keyboard feet, and support for an optional 120 MB hard drive.

The PowerBook 180 added external video output, allowing connection to an external monitor, projector, or television, addressing a limitation of the PowerBook 170. The standard configuration with an 80 MB hard drive was priced at US$3,870 (equivalent to $8,879 in 2025).

Like the PowerBook 160, the PowerBook 180 also introduced a power-saving mode that reduced the processor speed to 16 MHz to extend battery life.

Apple discontinued the PowerBook 180 on May 16, 1994.

== PowerBook 180c ==
Introduced on June 7, 1993, the PowerBook 180c was a color version of the PowerBook 180. It retained the 180's internal hardware, including its 33 MHz Motorola 68030 processor and Motorola 68882 floating-point unit, but replaced the monochrome display with an 8.4-inch (210 mm) active-matrix color liquid-crystal display (LCD) capable of displaying 256 colors.

The PowerBook 180c was the first PowerBook with a native display resolution of 640 × 480 pixels. Although its display measured only 8.4 inches (210 mm) diagonally, compared with the 9.5-inch (240 mm) monochrome display used on earlier models, the higher resolution increased pixel density to approximately 93 dpi, compared with about 77 dpi on previous PowerBooks. The thicker display assembly required a redesigned display enclosure, which Apple also used on the PowerBook 165c.

Contemporary reviews praised the active-matrix display for its sharp image quality, wide viewing angles, and suitability for presentations, particularly in comparison with the passive-matrix display used on the PowerBook 165c. Reviewers also noted that similarly configured PowerBook 180c models cost about US$800 more than comparable PowerBook 165c models, with a configuration including a 40 MB hard drive priced at US$4,159 (equivalent to $9,300 in 2025).

Apple discontinued the PowerBook 180c on March 14, 1994.

== Timeline ==
Timeline of portable Macintoshes
See also: List of Mac models
