= PowerBook 100 =

Laptop by Apple

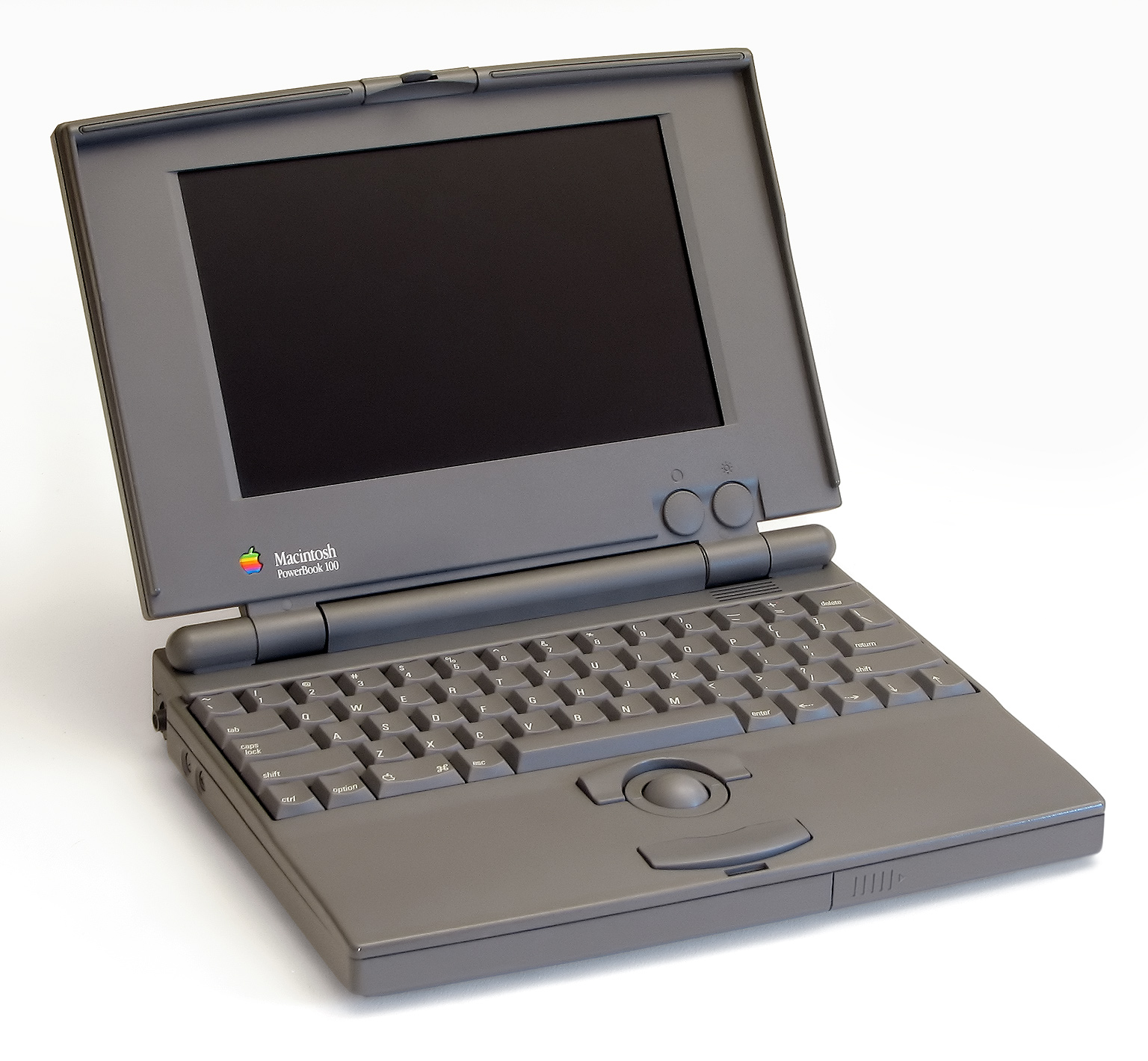
- PowerBook 100
- Developer: Apple Computer
- Manufacturer: Sony
- Product family: PowerBook (100 series)
- Type: Laptop
- Released: October 21, 1991; 35 years ago
- Introductory price: US$2,500 (equivalent to $5,900 in 2025)
- Discontinued: September 3, 1992; 34 years ago
- Operating system: System 6.0.8L/7.0.1–7.5.5
- CPU: Motorola 68000 @ 16 MHz
- Memory: 2 MB, expandable to 8 MB
- Display: 9-inch, 640 × 400 monochrome passive matrix LCD
- Dimensions: 1.8 × 11 × 8.5 in (46 × 279 × 216 mm)
- Weight: 5.1 lb (2.3 kg)
- Predecessor: Macintosh Portable
- Successor: PowerBook 145; PowerBook Duo series
- Related: PowerBook 140; PowerBook 170

The PowerBook 100 is a laptop computer designed and manufactured by Sony for Apple Computer and introduced on October 21, 1991, at the COMDEX computer expo in Las Vegas, Nevada. Priced at US$2,500 (equivalent to $5,900 in 2025), it was the entry-level model in the original PowerBook line, below the mid-range PowerBook 140 and high-end PowerBook 170. The PowerBook 100 reused much of the architecture from its predecessor, the Macintosh Portable, including its 16 MHz Motorola 68000 processor, but packaged the hardware in a substantially smaller enclosure. To further reduce its size and weight, it omitted an internal floppy disk drive in favor of an external drive. Like the other original PowerBook models, it placed the trackball in front of the keyboard, creating a palm-rest area. This arrangement was later adopted by many notebook computers.

Apple discontinued the model on September 3, 1992, replacing it with the PowerBook 145 as its entry-level notebook, while the PowerBook Duo line became its subcompact offering. In 2005, Mobile PC magazine ranked the PowerBook 100 the "#1 gadget of all time", and in 2006, PC World ranked it the tenth-greatest PC of all time.

== History ==
From 1990, John Sculley, then CEO of Apple, oversaw product development personally to ensure that Apple released new computers to market more quickly. His new strategy was to increase market share by lowering prices and releasing more "hit" products. This strategy contributed to the commercial success of the low-end Macintosh Classic and Macintosh LC, desktop computers released by Apple in 1990. Sculley wanted to replicate the success of these products with Apple's new PowerBook line.

Sculley began the project in 1990 and wanted the PowerBook to be released within one year. The project had three managers: John Medica, who managed engineering for the new laptop; Randy Battat, who was the vice president for product marketing; and Neil Selvin, who headed the marketing effort. In 1991, the two leaders in the laptop computer industry were Toshiba and Compaq, both of which had introduced models weighing less than 8 lb (3.63 kg). Medica, Battat, and Selvin deliberately designed the PowerBook to weigh less than its competitors.

In 1991, notebook computers were the fastest-growing segment of the DOS PC market, accounting for 13 percent of sales and growing more rapidly than desktop systems. Apple sought to compete in this market by pricing the PowerBook competitively with DOS notebooks and introducing it on October 21, 1991, at the COMDEX computer expo in Las Vegas, a trade show traditionally focused on DOS-based personal computers, alongside two other models: the mid-range PowerBook 140 and high-end PowerBook 170.

Sculley allocated a $1 million (equivalent to $2.4 million in 2025) marketing budget to the PowerBook product line, in contrast to the $25 million (equivalent to $59 million in 2025) used to market the Macintosh Classic. Medica, Battat, and Selvin used most of the money to produce and air a television commercial that viewers would remember. Advertising agency Chiat/Day filmed retired Los Angeles Lakers basketball star Kareem Abdul-Jabbar sitting uncomfortably in a small airline coach seat yet typing comfortably on his PowerBook. The ad caption read: "At least his hands are comfortable."

Both the promotional campaign and the product itself were successful. Apple set a target of selling over 200,000 units of the PowerBook within the first year, with peak demand anticipated in the initial three months following its release. By January 1992, Apple had already sold more than 100,000 PowerBooks, a milestone that was reached despite the product facing shortages in supply. Apple soon solved the supply problems, and the proceeds from PowerBook sales reached $1 billion in the first year after launch. Apple surpassed Toshiba and Compaq as the market leader in worldwide share of portable computer shipments. The PowerBook 100, 140, and 170 contributed greatly to Apple's financial success in 1992. At the end of the financial year, Apple announced its highest figures yet: $7.1 billion in revenues and an increase in global market share from 8% to 8.5%, the highest it had been in four years.

The PowerBook 100 proved to be the least popular of the three models, with customers were willing to pay more for the extra features offered on the 140 and 170 models. In early 1992, Apple started offering a PowerBook 100 without the external floppy drive for $2,300 (equivalent to $5,300 in 2025). By August 10, 1992, Apple quietly dropped the PowerBook 100 from its price list but continued to sell existing stock through its own dealers and alternative discount consumer-oriented stores such as Price Club. In these outlets, a configuration featuring 4 MB of RAM, a 40 MB hard drive, and a floppy drive was sold for less than $1,000 (equivalent to $2,300 in 2025), marking a substantial discount from the original list price of the 2 MB/20 MB configuration.

On September 17, 1992, Apple recalled 60,000 PowerBook 100s because of a potential safety problem. It was discovered that an electrical short could lead to the melting of a small hole in the casing. This issue affected three out of the 60,000 notebooks manufactured between October 1991 and March 1992. On the day of the recall, Apple shares closed at $47, down $1.25, but some analysts discounted the recall's importance. In addition, the original power supplies had problems with insulation cracks that could cause a short in a fuse on the motherboard; and the computer was prone to cracks in the power adapter socket on the motherboard, which required a $400 replacement motherboard if the warranty had expired.

== Features ==
Most of the PowerBook 100's internal hardware was derived from the Macintosh Portable, including its 16 MHz Motorola 68HC000 processor. In its base configuration, the PowerBook 100 had 2 MB of RAM and a 20 MB hard drive. The dimensions of the PowerBook 100 were an improvement over the Portable. It was 8.5 inches (22 cm) deep, 11 inches (28 cm) wide, and 1.8 inches (4.6 cm) high, compared to the Portable, which was 14.83 inches (37.7 cm) deep, 15.25 inches (38.7 cm) wide and 4.05 inches (10.3 cm) high. Another significant difference was the less expensive passive matrix display used instead of the sharper active matrix used on the Portable (and the 170). The PowerBook 100 shipped with the System 7.0.1 and supported versions through System 7.5.5. However, unlike the PowerBook 140 and 170, Apple allowed users to downgrade to System 6.0.8L.

The PowerBook 100 included a single RS-422 serial port, whereas most Macintosh models of the period had two, conventionally labeled for printer and networking use but functionally interchangeable. Instead, Apple offered an optional internal 2400 bit/s modem. The single-port design prevented simultaneous use of a directly connected printer and an AppleTalk network or external modem. Third-party manufacturers offered expansion cards that restored a second serial port by using the internal modem slot. The PowerBook 100 also lacked audio input and video output. Without video output, it could not drive an external display, projector, or television.

The PowerBook 100 used the same Power Manager chip as the Portable, which was responsible for controlling the display's backlight, hard drive spin-down, sleep and wake and battery charging. Unlike the Portable and the other original PowerBook models it also included three 3.5 V backup batteries that preserved the contents of RAM while the main battery was replaced or the computer was temporarily disconnected from power. This capability allowed Apple's RAM disk feature to persist after shutdown, reducing hard disk access and startup times, which improved battery life.

The PowerBook 100 was the first PowerBook to incorporate SCSI Disk Mode, allowing it to function as an external hard disk for another Macintosh over SCSI. The feature required proprietary SCSI cables and remained unique to the PowerBook 100 until later PowerBook models added support more than a year later.

The PowerBook 100 was available with 63-key US and 64-key ISO QWERTY keyboards. Because the Caps Lock key lacked a mechanical locking mechanism or indicator light, System 7 displayed an on-screen icon (⇪) in the menu bar when Caps Lock was enabled.

== Design ==
Apple approached Sony in late 1989 for assistance designing and manufacturing the PowerBook 100, as it lacked sufficient engineering resources to develop the number of products planned for release in 1991.

The PowerBook 100 was designed between September and December 1990. Sony engineers in San Diego and Japan used a basic blueprint from Apple, including a list of chips and other components and the Macintosh Portable's architecture, to miniaturize the design. Sony had little experience designing and building personal computers but nonetheless completed the task under 13 months, cancelling other projects and giving the PowerBook 100 top priority. Sony project manager Kihey Yamamoto was allowed by Sony president Norio Ohga to recruit engineers from across the company, and the project was completed.

Meanwhile, the PowerBook 140 and 170 were designed by the Apple Industrial Design Group between March 1990 and February 1991. The PowerBook 100 design benefited from the lessons learned in developing the more powerful models' enclosure and shared styling elements, including an adaptation of Apple's Snow White design language, using a darker gray color scheme and raised ridges in place of the lighter colors and recessed lines found on Apple's desktop products. The ridges provided visual continuity with Apple's product designs and also improved grip on the portable computers.

Robert Brunner, Apple's head of industrial design at the time, said his team designed the PowerBook "so it would be as easy to use and carry as a regular book". The dark granite gray color differed from the beige and platinum gray finishes commonly used by Apple and other computer manufacturers at the time. The centrally positioned trackball allowed use by both left- and right-handed users. Brunner described the design as a personal accessory and said, "It says something about the identity of the person who is carrying it".

The PowerBook 100 was smaller and thinner than the PowerBook 140 and 170, partly because it used an external floppy disk drive. Its reduced enclosure size also led to the use of a smaller trackball, 25 millimeters (0.98 in) compared with 30 mm (1.2 in) on the 140 and 170.

== Reception ==
Crystal Waters of Home Office Computing praised the PowerBook 100's "unique, effective design" but was disappointed because the internal modem did not receive faxes, and the 100 had no monitor port. The low-capacity 20 MB hard drive was also criticized. Once a user's core applications had been installed, little room was left for optional programs and documents. Waters concluded: "Having used the 100 constantly in the past few weeks, I know I wouldn't feel cheated by buying it - if only it had a 40MB hard-disk drive option."

PC Week benchmarked the PowerBook 100, measuring it against its predecessor, the Macintosh Portable. The PowerBook 100 took 5.3 seconds to open a Microsoft Word document and 2.5 seconds to save it, while the Portable took 5.4 and 2.6 seconds respectively. PC Week tested the battery life, which delivered 3 hours, 47 minutes of use. Byte magazine's review concluded, "The PowerBook 100 is recommended for word processing and communications tasks; the higher-end products [referencing the PowerBook 140 and 170] offer enough power for complex reports, large spreadsheets and professional graphics." MacWEEK described it as "ideal for writers and others on a tight budget."

PC World named the PowerBook 100 series the 10th-greatest PC of all time in 2006, and in 2005, US magazine Mobile PC chose the PowerBook 100 series as the greatest gadget of all time, ahead of the Sony Walkman and Atari 2600. The PowerBook 100 received multiple awards for its design, including the 1999 IDSA Silver Design of the Decade Award, Form magazine's 1993 Designer's Design Awards, the 1992 ISDA Gold Industrial Design Excellence Award, the 1992 Appliance Manufacturer Excellence in Design award, and the Industry Forum Design 10 Best - Hannover Fair award.

== Technical specifications ==
According to Apple, all of these models are obsolete. (Note: Apple products that have been discontinued for 7 years and no longer receive hardware support or spare parts)

Model	PowerBook 100	
Code name	Elwood, Jake, O'Shanter & Bess, Asahi, Classic, Derringer, Rosebud, and Sapporo	
Model	M1506	
Gestalt ID	24	
Order number	M0567	M1045
CPU	Motorola 68000 @ 16 MHz	
ROM	256 KB	
RAM	2 MB (expandable to 8 MB), 100 ns SIMMs	
Display	9-inch (23 cm) monochrome passive matrix (FSTN) backlit LCD, 640 × 400 resolution	
Storage	20–40 MB SCSI internal hard disk	20–40 MB SCSI internal hard disk 3.5" external SuperDrive
Networking	AppleTalk, optional modem	
Ports	1 × ADB (keyboard, mouse); 1 × mini-DIN-8 RS-422 serial port (printer/modem, AppleTalk); 1 × HDI-20 (ext. floppy drive); 1 × HDI-30 connector SCSI (ext. hard drive, scanner); 1 × 3.5 mm headphone jack socket	
OS	System 6.0.8L/7.0.1 – 7.5.5	
Expansion	1 × serial modem slot	
Audio	8-bit mono 22 kHz	
Battery	7.2V sealed lead acid rechargeable battery 3 × 3.5V lithium backup batteries	
Dimensions	8.5 in × 11 in × 1.8 in (22 × 28 × 4.6 cm); 5.1 lb (2.31 kg)	

== Timeline ==
Timeline of portable Macintoshes
See also: List of Mac models

== See also ==
- Macintosh Portable
- List of Mac models grouped by CPU type
