= Active matrix =

Addressing scheme in flat panel displays

Active matrix is a type of addressing scheme used in flat panel displays. It is a method of switching individual elements of a flat panel display, known as pixels. Each pixel is attached to a transistor and capacitor that actively maintain the pixel state while other pixels are being addressed, in contrast with the older passive matrix technology in which each pixel must maintain its state passively, without being driven by circuitry.

Active matrix technology was invented by Bernard J. Lechner at RCA, using MOSFETs (metal–oxide–semiconductor field-effect transistors). Active matrix technology was first demonstrated as a feasible device using thin-film transistors (TFTs) by T. Peter Brody, Fang Chen Luo and their team at the Thin-Film Devices department of Westinghouse Electric Corporation in 1974, and the term was introduced into the literature in 1975.

Given an m × n matrix, the number of connectors needed to address the display is m + n (just like in passive matrix technology). Each pixel is attached to a switch-device, which actively maintains the pixel state while other pixels are being addressed, also preventing crosstalk from inadvertently changing the state of an unaddressed pixel. The most common switching devices use TFTs, i.e. a FET based on either the cheaper non-crystalline thin-film silicon (a-Si), polycrystalline silicon (poly-Si), or CdSe semiconductor material.

Another variant is to use diodes or resistors, but neither diodes (e.g. metal insulator metal diodes), nor non-linear voltage dependent resistors (i.e. varistors) are currently used with the latter not yet economical, compared to TFT.

The Macintosh Portable (1989) was perhaps the first consumer laptop to employ an active matrix panel. Since the decline of cathode-ray tubes, as a consumer display technology, virtually all TVs, computer monitors and smartphone screens that use LCD or OLED technology employ active matrix technology.

== See also ==
- AMLCD
- AMOLED
- QLED
- TFT-LCD
- Passive matrix addressing
- Pixel geometry
- Comparison of display technology
