= Passive matrix =

Addressing scheme for LCDs

Passive matrix is a type of addressing scheme used in early liquid crystal displays (LCDs). It is a matrix addressing scheme, meaning that only m + n control signals are required to address an m × n display. A pixel in a passive matrix must maintain its state without active driving circuitry until it can be refreshed again.

The signal is divided into a row or select signal and a column or video signal. The select voltage determines the row that is being addressed and all n pixels on a row are addressed simultaneously. When pixels on a row are being addressed, a V_{sel} potential is applied, and all other rows are unselected with a V_{unsel} potential. The video signal or column potential is then applied with a potential for each m columns individually. An on-switched (lit) pixel corresponds to a V_{on}, an off-switched (unlit) corresponds to a V_{off} potential.

The potential across pixel at selected row i and column j is

$$V_{ij} = V_\mathit{sel} - V_\mathit{on|off}$$

and

$$V_{ij} = V_\mathit{unsel} - V_\mathit{on|off}$$

for the unselected rows.

This scheme has been expanded to define the limits of this type of addressing typical LCDs.

Passive matrix addressed displays, such as ferroelectric liquid crystal displays, do not need the switch component of an active matrix display, because they have built-in bistability. Technology for electronic paper also has a form of bistability. Displays with bistable pixel elements are addressed with a passive matrix addressing scheme, whereas TFT LCD displays are addressed using active addressing.

== See also ==
- Active matrix addressing
- Pixel geometry
- Liquid crystal display
