= Motorola 68030 =

32-bit microprocessor

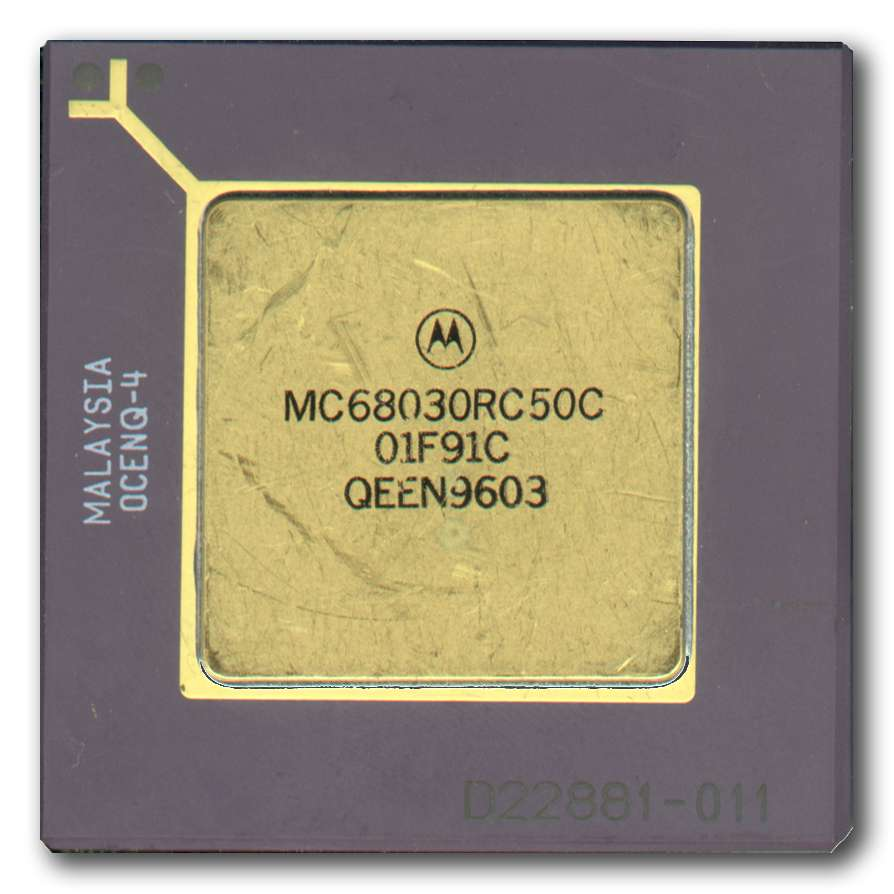

General information
- Launched: 1987
- Designed by: Motorola

Performance
- Max. CPU clock rate: 16 MHz to 50 MHz
- Data width: 32 bits
- Address width: 32 bits

Physical specifications
- Transistors: 273,000
- Package: 132 pin QFP and PGA 169 (128 pins used)

Cache
- L1 cache: 256 bytes each for instruction and data, 16 lines of 4 entries of 4 bytes each, direct mapped

Architecture and classification
- Instruction set: Motorola 68000 series

Products, models, variants
- Variant: 68EC030

History
- Predecessor: Motorola 68020
- Successor: Motorola 68040

The Motorola 68030 ("sixty-eight-oh-thirty") is a 32-bit microprocessor in the Motorola 68000 family. It was released in 1987. The 68030 was the successor to the Motorola 68020, and was followed by the Motorola 68040. In keeping with general Motorola naming, this CPU is often referred to as the 030 (pronounced oh-three-oh or oh-thirty).

The 68030 is essentially a 68020 with a memory management unit (MMU) and instruction and data caches of 256 bytes each. It added a burst mode for the caches, where four longwords can be loaded into the cache in a single operation. The MMU was mostly compatible with the external 68851 that would be used with the 68020, but being internal allowed it to access memory one cycle faster than a 68020/68851 combo. The 68030 did not include a built-in floating-point unit (FPU), and was generally used with the 68881 and the faster 68882. The addition of the FPU was a major design note of the subsequent 68040. The 68030 typically increases performance by ≈5% over the 68020, while reducing power draw by ≈25%.

The 68030 features 273,000 transistors. A lower-cost version was also released, the Motorola 68EC030, lacking the on-chip MMU. It was commonly available in both 132-pin QFP and 128-pin PGA packages. The poorer thermal characteristics of the QFP package limited that variant to 33 MHz; the PGA 68030s included 40 MHz and 50 MHz versions. There was also a small supply of QFP packaged EC variants.

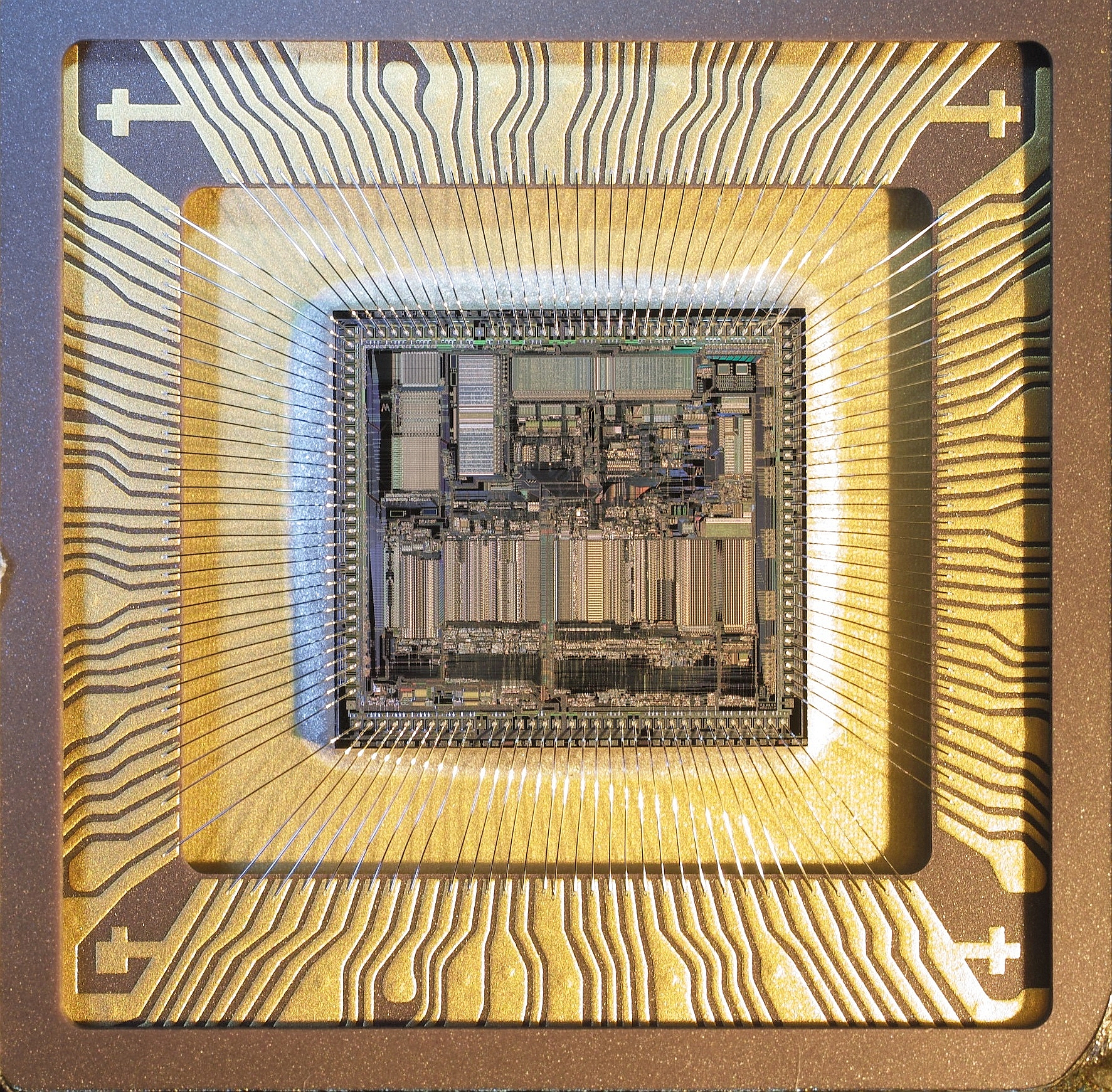
Motorola MC68030RC33B die

The 68030 can be used with the 68020 bus, in which case its performance is similar to 68020 that it was derived from. However, the 68030 provides an additional synchronous bus interface which, if used, accelerates memory accesses up to 33% compared to an equally clocked 68020. The finer manufacturing process allowed Motorola to scale the full-version processor to 50 MHz. The EC variety topped out at 40 MHz.

== Usage ==
The 68030 was used in many models of the Apple Macintosh II and Commodore Amiga series of personal computers, NeXT Computer, later Alpha Microsystems multiuser systems, and some descendants of the Atari ST line such as the Atari TT and the Atari Falcon. It was also used in Unix workstations such as the Sun Microsystems Sun-3x line of desktop workstations (the earlier "sun3" used a 68020), Apollo Computer's DN3500 and DN4500 workstations, laser printers and the Nortel Networks DMS-100 telephone central office switch. More recently, the 68030 core has also been adapted by Freescale into a microcontroller for embedded applications.

LeCroy has used the 68EC030 in certain models of their 9300 Series digital oscilloscopes including “C” suffix models and high performance 9300 Series models, along with the Mega Waveform Processing hardware option for 68020-based 9300 Series models.

== Variants ==
The 68EC030 is a low cost version of the 68030, the difference between the two being that the 68EC030 omits the on-chip memory management unit (MMU) and is thus essentially an upgraded 68020.

The 68EC030 was used as the CPU for the low-cost model of the Amiga 4000, and on a number of CPU accelerator cards for the Commodore Amiga line of computers. It was also used in the Cisco Systems 2500 Series router, a small-to-medium enterprise computer internetworking appliance. Additionally it was also used as the primary processor in a number of Alpha Microsystems Eagle mini-computers.

The 50 MHz speed is exclusive to the ceramic PGA package, the plastic 68030 stopped at 40 MHz.

== Technical data ==
CPU clock rate	16, 20, 25, 33, 40, 50 MHz, except for MC68EC030 available in 25 and 40 MHz
	Internal split-cache modified Harvard architecture
Address bus	32 bit
Data bus	32 bit
Cache	256 bytes each for instruction and data, 16 lines of 4 entries of 4 bytes each, direct mapped
	dynamic bus sizing
	burst memory interface
Performance	18 MIPS @ 50 MHz

== See also ==
- List of Macintosh models grouped by CPU type
