= SuperDrive =

Floppy disk or optical disk drive made by Apple

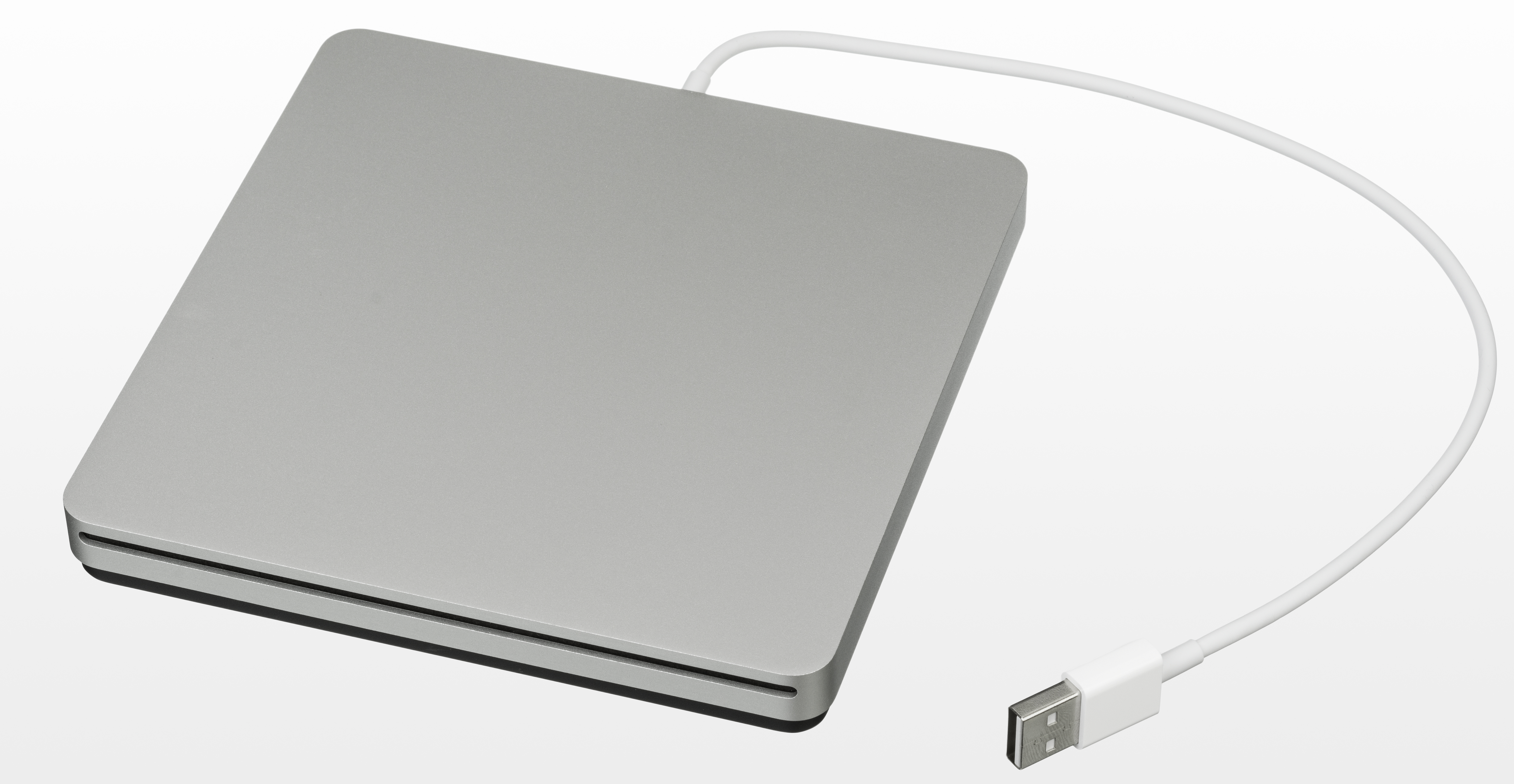
An external CD/DVD SuperDrive

SuperDrive is the product name for a floppy disk drive and later an optical disc drive made and marketed by Apple Inc. The name was initially used for Apple's high-density floppy disk drive, and later for the internal CD and DVD drive integrated with Apple computers. In 2008, Apple introduced an external USB SuperDrive alongside the MacBook Air, which lacked a built-in optical drive. Apple stopped selling computers with built-in SuperDrives in 2016, and discontinued the USB SuperDrive in 2024.

== Floppy disk drive ==
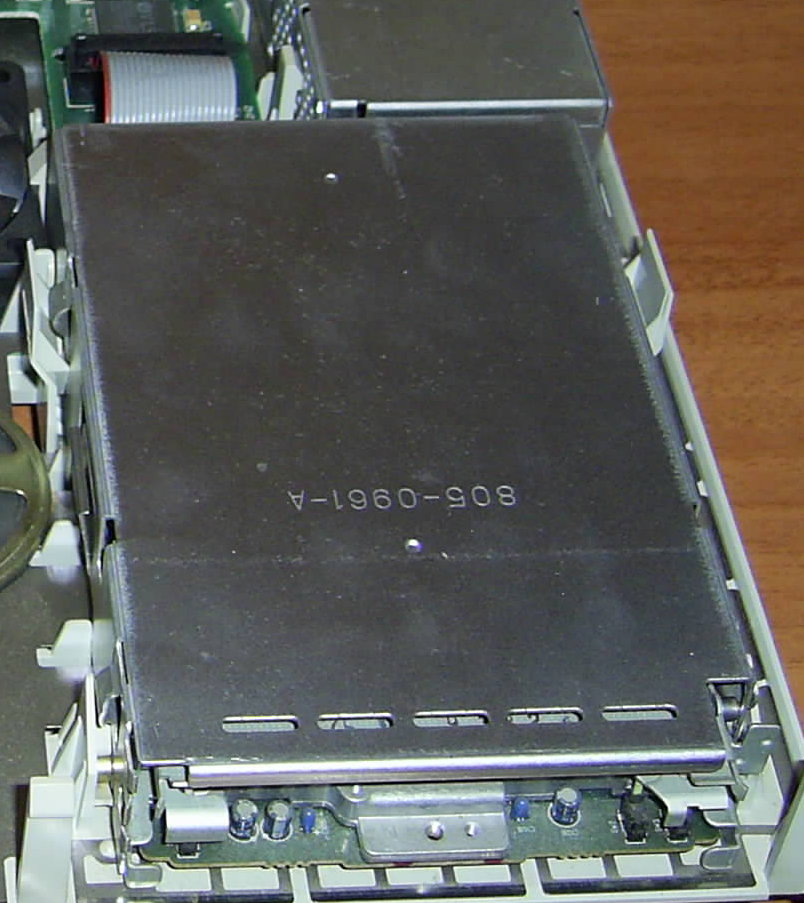
Internal SuperDrive floppy drive on a Macintosh LC II

The term was first used by Apple Computer in 1988 to refer to their 1.44 MB 3.5 inch floppy drive. This replaced the older 800 KB floppy drive that had been standard in the Macintosh up to then, but remained compatible in that it could continue to read and write both 800 KB (double-sided) and 400 KB (single-sided) floppy disks, as well as the newer high-density floppies.

This drive was also capable of reading and writing MS-DOS formatted disks and FAT12 file formats, using PC Exchange or other software, unlike the 400 KB and 800 KB drives. This was made possible as the SuperDrive now utilitized the same MFM (Modified Frequency Modulation) encoding scheme used by the IBM PC, yet still retained backward compatibility with Apple's variable-speed zoned CAV scheme and group coded recording encoding format, so it could continue to read Macintosh MFS, HFS and Apple II ProDOS formats on 400/800 KB disks.

Introduced in 1988 under the Trademark name FDHD (Floppy Disk High Density), the subsequently renamed SuperDrive was known primarily as an internally mounted floppy drive that was part of the Macintosh computer; however, an external version of the drive was manufactured that came in a Snow White-styled plastic case.

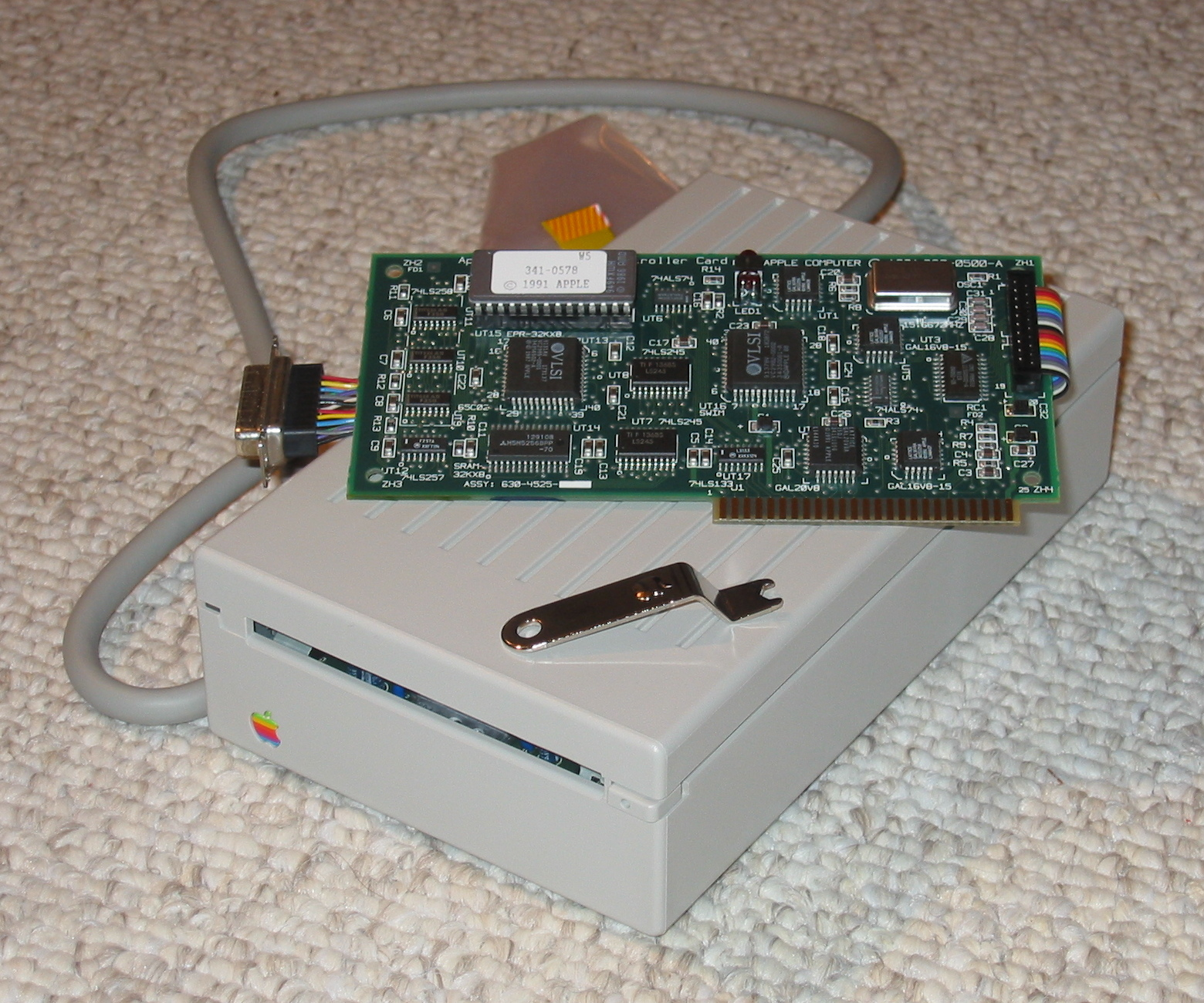
Apple II 3.5 Disk Controller Card & Apple SuperDrive

While the external drive worked on both Apple's product lines, it was mainly intended for use on the Apple II series, for which Apple introduced in 1991 a slot-based interface called the Apple II 3.5 Disk Controller Card for Apple IIe and IIGS computers so they too could use 1.40 MB storage and read/write MS-DOS. The controller card as well as the external Superdrive were discontinued in June 1994.

The SuperDrive cannot be used with the original four Mac models (Macintosh 128K through Macintosh Plus), as their disk controller (the IWM) doesn't support high density. The next two models to be released (Macintosh II & Macintosh SE (1987)) also shipped with that controller; a SuperDrive connected to them will behave as an 800 KB drive. These two models can be upgraded via the M0244 upgrade kit (which replaces the IWM disk controller with the SWIM) and gain full use of the SuperDrive. All later models shipped with the SWIM.

The first Macintosh model to include a SuperDrive floppy drive was the Macintosh IIx (1988). Every Macintosh and PowerBook introduced from 1988 to 1997 (with the exception of the PowerBook 100, PowerBook Duo series, and PowerBook 2400c, which offered a proprietary external floppy drive as an option), had a built-in SuperDrive floppy drive. The last model to include one was the beige Power Macintosh G3 series, which was manufactured until January 1999.

The PowerBook G3 1998 model (a.k.a. Wallstreet) had an optional floppy drive module. The PowerBook 190 series, PowerBook 5300 Series, PowerBook 3400c, and original PowerBook G3 shared the same interchangeable floppy drive module as a standard feature. The drive as mounted on PowerBooks lacked the auto-inject feature of Apple's initial desktop SuperDrive implementation, requiring the user to manually insert the disk all the way into the drive. The feature was dropped throughout the lineup during 1993–94.

The PowerBook 1400 series also had a floppy drive module, but was incompatible with the other PowerBooks. The end of the SuperDrive coincides with the demise of Old World ROM Macs; with the advent of the New World ROM machines, Apple stopped offering internal floppy drives on all models. The SuperDrive is not supported in Mac OS X, not even on the few Old World ROM machines that can officially run OS X.

== Internal CD and DVD drive ==
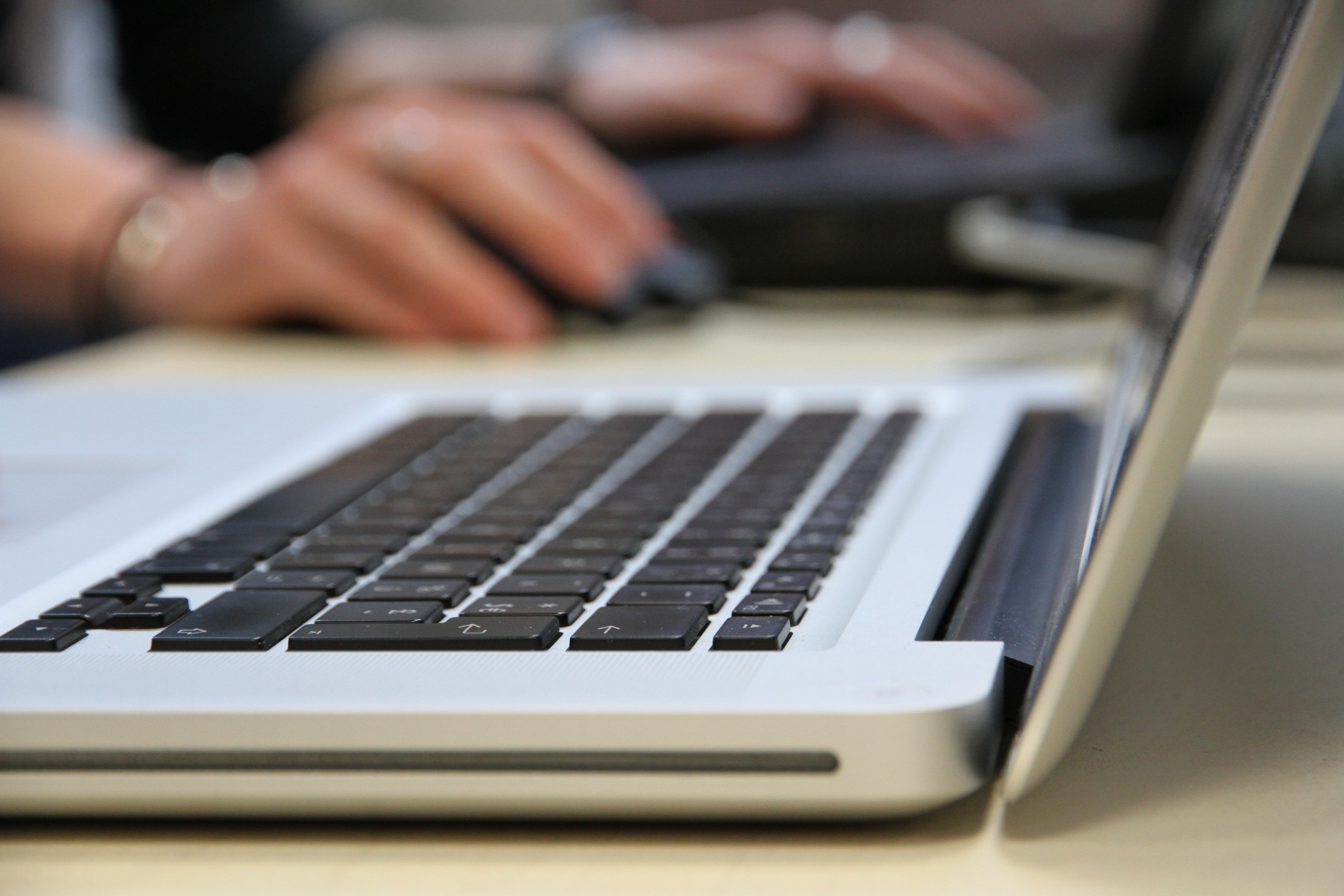
An integrated SuperDrive shown on the right side of a MacBook Pro

Once the use of floppy disks started declining, Apple reused the trademark to refer to the optical drives built into its Macintosh models, which could read and write both DVDs and CDs. The early 2001 release of the Power Mac G4 was the first Macintosh to include a SuperDrive. SuperDrives featured 6–24x write speeds and supported the DVD±R, DVD±RW, CD-R, and CD-RW formats along with all normal read-only media. Some drive models used as SuperDrives are capable of reading DVD-RAM; on these drives, the ability to write to these discs is disabled. Apple never offered a Blu-ray drive or supported playback of the format. DVD±R DL Dual Layer DVD did not come out until 2005 and was not supported on the SuperDrive until the release of early 2005 models of PowerMac G5 which came with updated SuperDrives which supported DL recording on DL media.

Unlike tray-style disc holders which have an inner guide ring, slot-style drives will not work with MiniCD or MiniDVD discs (8 cm diameter instead of 12 cm) unless an 8 cm optical disc adapter is used, and extraction of the disc is difficult, requiring tweezers, use of a card with double-sided sticky tape, or complete disassembly of it.

The MacBook Air, released on January 29, 2008, was the first Macintosh to not include a SuperDrive after it became standard across the line. Apple began phasing SuperDrives out across the Macintosh line with the Mac Mini in 2011, the MacBook Pro and iMac in 2012, and the Mac Pro in 2013. The 2012 13-inch MacBook Pro, which was discontinued on October 27, 2016, was the last Macintosh Apple sold that included a SuperDrive.

== External CD and DVD drive ==
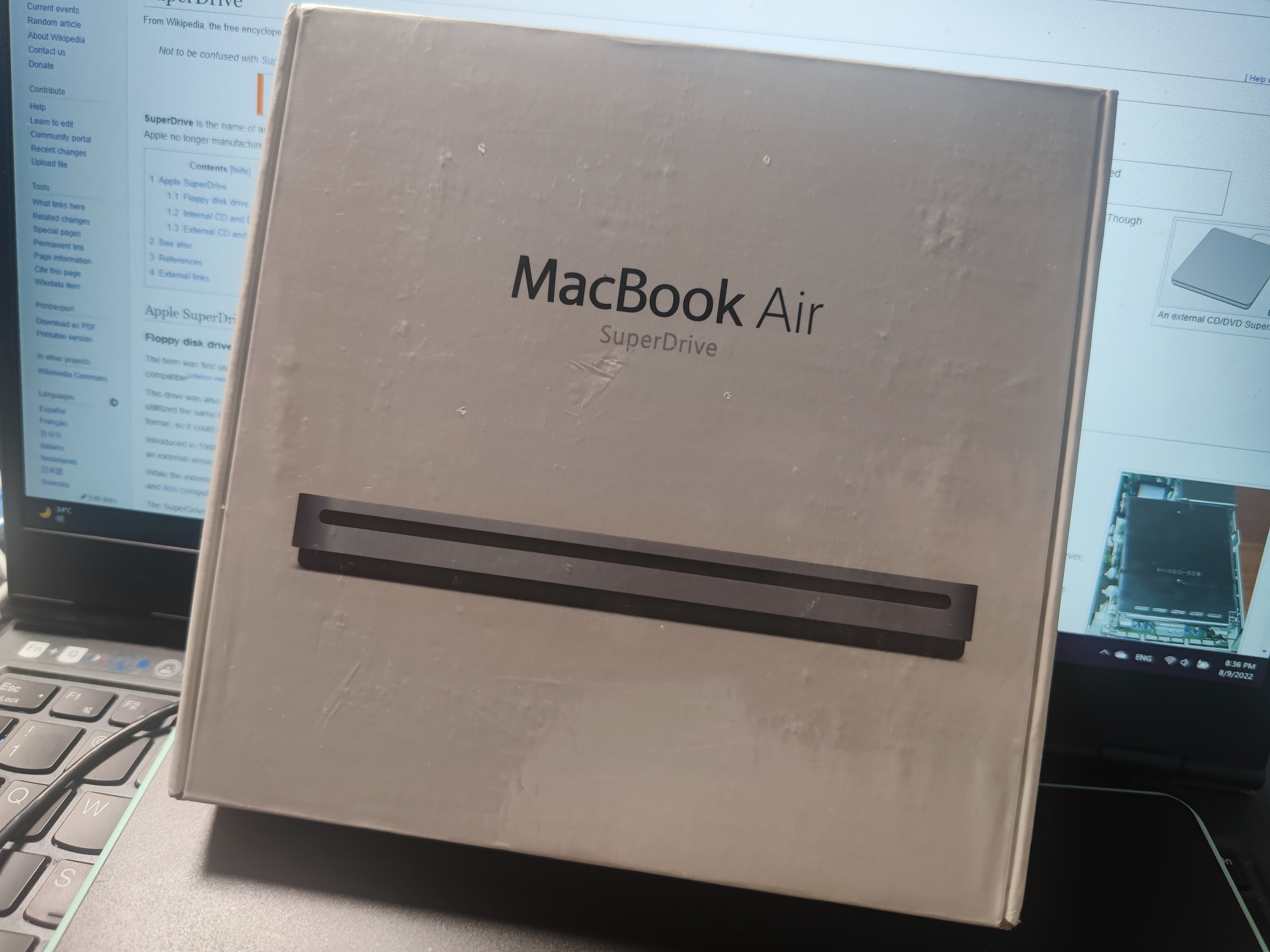
The packaging of the MacBook Air SuperDrive (later renamed USB SuperDrive)

Apple introduced a USB-connected external SuperDrive as an accessory in 2008 with the MacBook Air. The drive received criticism and mixed customer reviews, with 410 reviews averaging two and a half stars before Apple removed customer reviews from their online store. Criticism includes the lack of support for Blu-ray or mini optical discs and malfunctions that make the drive inoperable, with no way to eject a stuck disc. The SuperDrive can only be plugged directly into a Mac, and may not function when connected to a hub or external display because it can exceed the normal power draw of the USB 2.0 specification, which USB ports on Macs can accommodate. On newer Mac computers, it also requires the additional purchase of a USB-C-to-USB-A adapter to connect. The USB SuperDrive was last in stock in August 2024, and was delisted from Apple's website in 2025.

== See also ==
- Macintosh External Disk Drive
- SuperDisk – a format designed by Imation as a successor to the floppy disk
- Combo drive – an optical drive that can read and write CDs and reads DVDs
- MacBook Air – a laptop made by Apple that utilizes Apple's first external USB SuperDrive
- DVD Player (macOS) – built-in macOS app for playing DVD movies
- Timeline of Apple Inc. products
- Xbox 360 HD DVD Player
