= PowerBook G4 =

Series of notebook computers created by Apple Computer

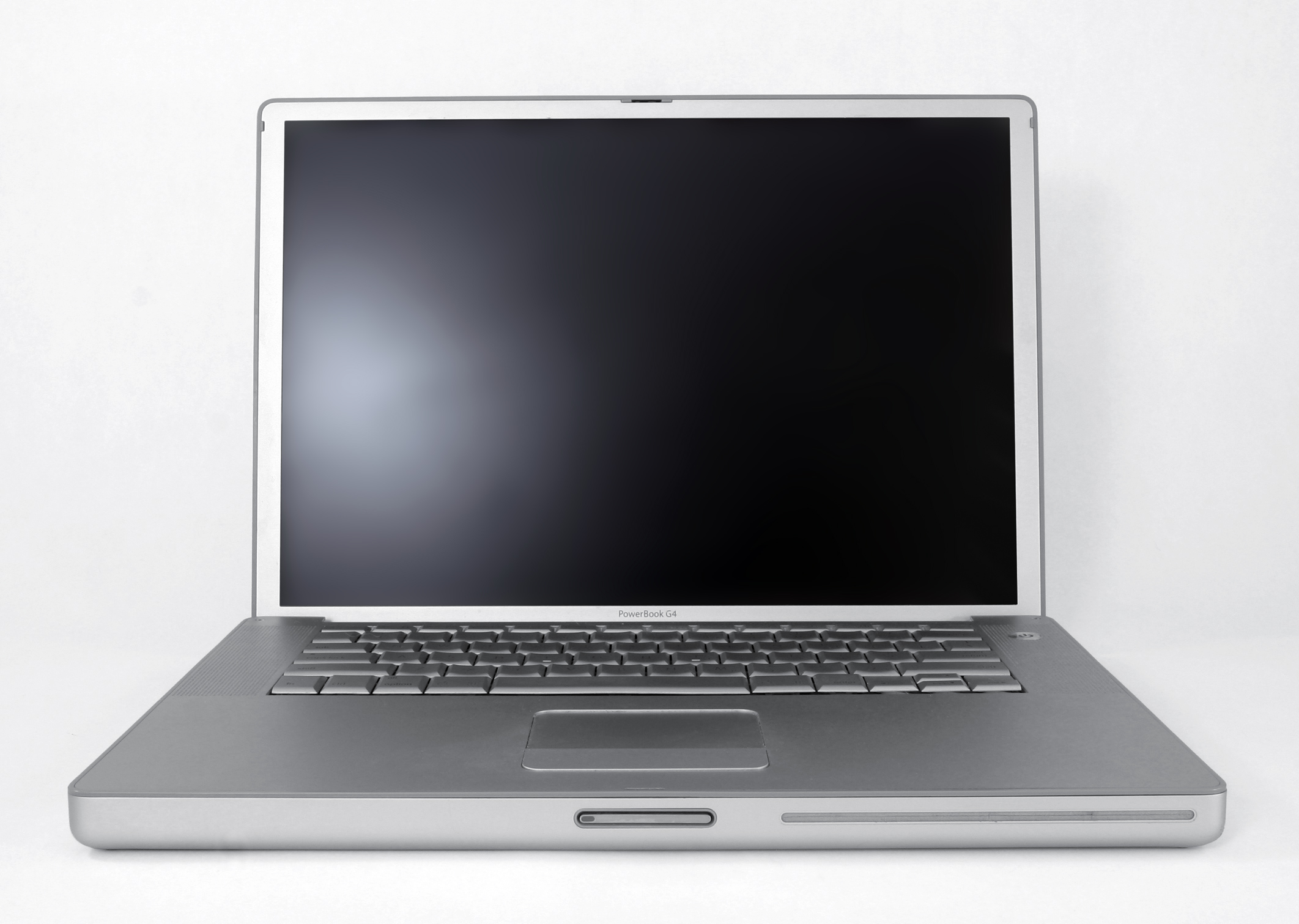
- An aluminum PowerBook G4 with a 15.2-inch screen
- Developer: Apple Computer
- Type: Laptop
- Released: January 9, 2001
- Discontinued: May 16, 2006
- CPU: PowerPC G4, 400 MHz–1.67 GHz
- Predecessor: PowerBook G3; PowerBook 2400c
- Successor: MacBook Pro (Intel-based)
- Website: https://web.archive.org/web/20020604030934/http://www.apple.com/powerbook/ at the Wayback Machine (archived June 4, 2002)

The PowerBook G4 is a series of notebook computers manufactured, marketed, and sold by Apple Computer between 2001 and 2006 as part of its PowerBook line of notebooks. The PowerBook G4 runs on the RISC-based PowerPC G4 processor, designed by the AIM (Apple/IBM/Motorola) development alliance and initially produced by Motorola. It was built later by Freescale, after Motorola spun off its semiconductor business under that name in 2004. The PowerBook G4 has had two different designs: one with a titanium body with a translucent black keyboard and a 15-inch screen; and another in an aluminum body with an aluminum-colored keyboard, in 12-inch, 15-inch, and 17-inch sizes.

Between 2001 and 2003, Apple produced the titanium PowerBook G4; between 2003 and 2006, the aluminum models were produced. Both models were hailed for their modern design, long battery life, and processing power. When the aluminum PowerBook G4s were first released in January 2003, 12-inch and 17-inch models were introduced first, while the 15-inch model retained the titanium body until September 2003, when a new aluminum 15-inch PowerBook was released. The aluminum 15-inch model also includes a FireWire 800 port, which had been included with the 17-inch model since its debut nine months earlier.

The PowerBook G4 is the last revision of the PowerBook series, and was succeeded by the Intel-powered MacBook Pro line in the first half of 2006. The last version of macOS that most PowerBook G4 computers can run is Mac OS X Leopard, which was released in 2007. When Apple switched to Intel x86 processors in 2006, some design features of the PowerBook G4's form and aluminum chassis were retained for the MacBook Pro.

== Titanium (2001-2003) ==
PowerBook G4 (titanium)
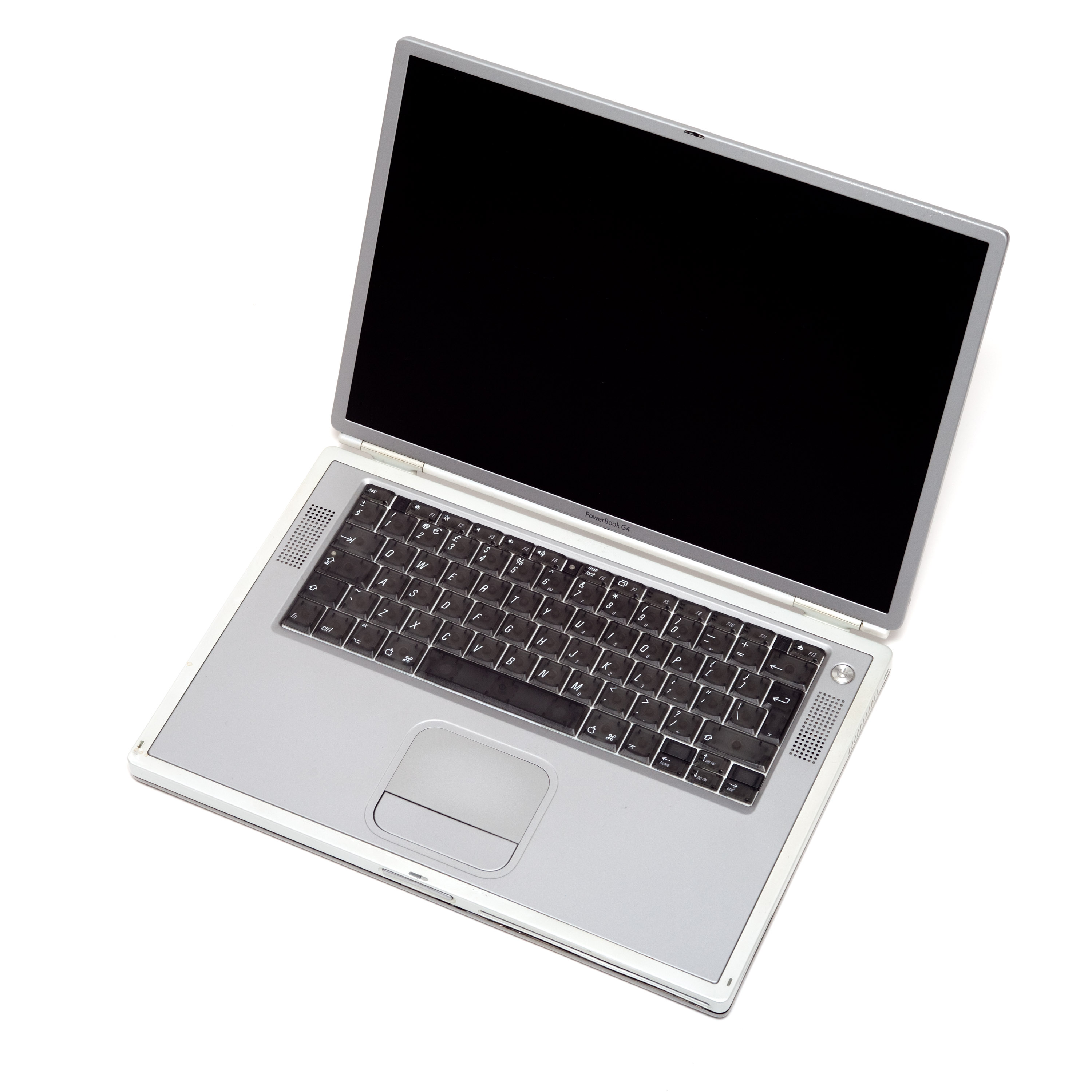
- The titanium PowerBook G4 (nicknamed TiBook)
- Developer: Apple Computer
- Manufacturer: Apple Computer; Quanta Computer; Foxconn
- Type: Laptop
- Released: January 9, 2001
- Discontinued: September 16, 2003
- CPU: PowerPC G4, 400 MHz–1 GHz
- Made in: USA, Taiwan, China (2002–2003)

The first PowerBook G4 models were announced at Steve Jobs' MacWorld Expo keynote on January 9, 2001. The two models featured a PowerPC G4 processor running at either 400 or 500 MHz in a 1 inch (25 mm) deep enclosure constructed from 0.016 inch (0.4mm) thick Grade 1 titanium, with a carbon-fiber reinforced plastic internal frame. This was 0.7 inches (18 mm) shallower than the G4's predecessor, the PowerBook G3. The G4 was one of the first laptops to use a screen with a widescreen aspect ratio. It also featured a front-mounted slot-loading optical drive. The notebook was given the unofficial nickname "TiBook", after the titanium case and the PowerBook brand name; it was sold alongside the cheaper iBook. The 1 GHz version of the titanium G4 is the last, and fastest, PowerBook that can natively run Mac OS 9 (version 9.2.2).

=== Industrial design ===
The initial design of the PowerBook G4 was developed by Apple hardware designers Jory Bell, Nick Merz, and Danny Delulis. Quanta, an original design manufacturer, also helped in the design. The new machine was a sharp departure from the black plastic, curvilinear PowerBook G3 models that preceded it. The orientation of the Apple logo on the computer's lid was switched so that it would "read" correctly to onlookers when the computer was in use. PowerBook G3 and prior models presented it right-side-up from the perspective of the computer's owner when the lid was closed. Apple's industrial design team, headed by British designer Jonathan Ive, converged around a minimalist aesthetic—the titanium G4's design language laid the groundwork for the aluminum PowerBook G4, the MacBook Pro, the Power Mac G5, the flat-screen iMac, the Xserve, and the Mac mini.

=== Reception ===
In a review, Macworld's Andrew Gore praised the PowerBook's weight, wider screen, and Velocity Engine, but criticized the difficulty of replacing the hard drive. In a battery test, he found that Apple's stated 5 hours of battery life could only be achieved with the screen dimmed and the processor clocked down to 300 MHz, though he described battery life in normal use, of slightly over three hours, as "very respectable". ATPM's Trevor Boehm rated it "excellent", describing it as pricy but a good desktop replacement, and praising its speed, screen, and ports, though he criticized the trackpad as oversensitive and inconvenient for drag and drop. PC World's Carla Thornton praised its design, screen and performance, but criticized its graphics, DVD speed, battery life and price.

=== Quality issues ===
The hinges on the titanium PowerBook display are notorious for breaking under typical use. Usually the hinge (which is shaped like an L) will break just to the left of where it attaches to the lower case on the right hinge, and just to the right on the left hinge (where the right hinge is on the right side of the computer when the optical drive is facing the user). When the 667 MHz and 800 MHz "DVI" PowerBooks were introduced, Apple changed the hinge design slightly to strengthen it. At least one aftermarket manufacturer began producing sturdier replacement hinges to address this problem, though actually performing the repair is difficult as the display bezel is glued together. In addition some discolouration, bubbling or peeling of paint on the outer bezel occurred, notably around the area where the palm would rest while using the trackpad, and around the rear of the hinges where paint on the back of the machine was often worn off. This appeared on early models but not on later titanium PowerBooks.

=== Display issues ===
The video cable is routed around the left-side hinge. This will cause the cable to weaken under heavy usage. Many owners have reported display problems such as random lines or a jumbled screen, although a few owners have replaced just the video cable to successfully resolve this problem. There is also a backlight cable that might fail; The best option is to replace either or both cables before replacing LCD screen.

=== Technical specifications ===
According to Apple, all of these models are obsolete. (Note: Apple products that have been discontinued for 7 years and no longer receive hardware support or spare parts)

Model		"Mercury", Original TiBook		"Onyx", Gigabit TiBook		"Ivory", DVI TiBook		"Antimony", TiBook	
Timetable	Released	January 9, 2001		October 16, 2001		April 29, 2002		November 6, 2002	
Timetable	Discontinued	October 16, 2001		April 29, 2002		November 6, 2002		September 16, 2003	
Model info.	Model number	M5884 (EMC 1854)		M8407 (EMC 1895)		A1001 (EMC 1913)		A1025 (EMC N/A)	
Model info.	Model identifier	PowerBook3,2		PowerBook3,3		PowerBook3,4		PowerBook3,5	
Model info.	Order number	M7952	M7710	M8362	M8363	M8591	M8592	M8858	M8859
Display	Size	15.2" (widescreen)							
Display	Method	TFT matte LCD							
Display	Resolution	1152×768				1280×854			
Performance	CPU	PowerPC 7410		PowerPC 7450		PowerPC 7455			
Performance	CPU speed	400 MHz	500 MHz	550 MHz	667 MHz		800 MHz	867 MHz	1 GHz
Performance	L2 cache	1 MB via 200 MHz back-side bus	1 MB via 250 MHz backside bus	256 KB on-chip					
Performance	L3 cache	None				1 MB		1 MB DDR	
Performance	Front-side bus	100 MHz			133 MHz				
Performance	RAM	128 MB; Expandable to 1 GB	256 MB; Expandable to 1 GB	128 MB; Expandable to 1 GB	256 MB; Expandable to 1 GB	256 or 512 MB; Expandable to 1 GB			
Performance	RAM type	PC100 SDRAM		PC133 SDRAM					
Graphics	Amount	8 MB of SDRAM		16 MB of SDRAM		32 MB of DDR SDRAM		32 MB or 64 MB of DDR SDRAM	
Graphics	Type	ATI Rage Mobility 128		ATI Radeon		ATI Radeon 7500		ATI Radeon 9000	
Graphics	AGP	2x		4x					
Storage	Hard drive Ultra ATA/66	10 GB; Optional 30 GB	20 GB; Optional 30 GB	20 GB; Optional 48 GB	30 GB; Optional 48 GB	30 GB at 4200 rpm Optional 60 GB at 5400 rpm	40 GB at 4200 rpm Optional 60 GB at 5400 rpm	40 GB at 4200 rpm	60 GB at 4200 rpm
Storage	Optical drive (slot-loading)	6× DVD-ROM		6× DVD-ROM; Optional 24× CD-ROM read, 8× CD-R write		8× DVD read, 24× CD-R read, 8× CD-R write		8× DVD read, 24× CD-R read, 8× CD-R write Optional 1× DVD-R write, 6× DVD read, 24× CD read, 8× CD-R write	
Connections	Connectivity	Optional AirPort 802.11b 10/100 BASE-T Fast Ethernet; 56k V.90 modem Infrared (IrDA)		Optional AirPort 802.11b Gigabit Ethernet; 56k V.90 modem Infrared (IrDA)	Integrated AirPort 802.11b Gigabit Ethernet; 56k V.90 modem Infrared (IrDA)	Optional or Integrated AirPort 802.11b Gigabit Ethernet; 56k V.92 modem			
Connections	Peripherals	2 × USB 1.1; 1 × FireWire 400; PC Card I/II; Built-in stereo speakers Audio output mini-jack				2 × USB 1.1; 1 × FireWire 400; PC Card I/II; Built-in stereo speakers Audio output mini-jack Audio input mini-jack			
Connections	Video out	VGA and S-Video				DVI and S-Video			
Battery		50 watt hour removable lithium-ion		55.3 watt hour removable lithium-ion				61 watt hour removable lithium-ion	
Operating system	Original	Mac OS 9.1		Mac OS X 10.1 "Puma"; Mac OS 9.2.2		Mac OS X 10.1.4 "Puma"; Mac OS 9.2.2		Mac OS X 10.2.1 "Jaguar"; Mac OS 9.2.2	
Operating system	Maximum	Mac OS X 10.4.11 "Tiger"; Mac OS 9.2.2						Mac OS X 10.5.8 “Leopard” Mac OS 9.2.2	

== Aluminum (2003-2006) ==
PowerBook G4 (aluminum)
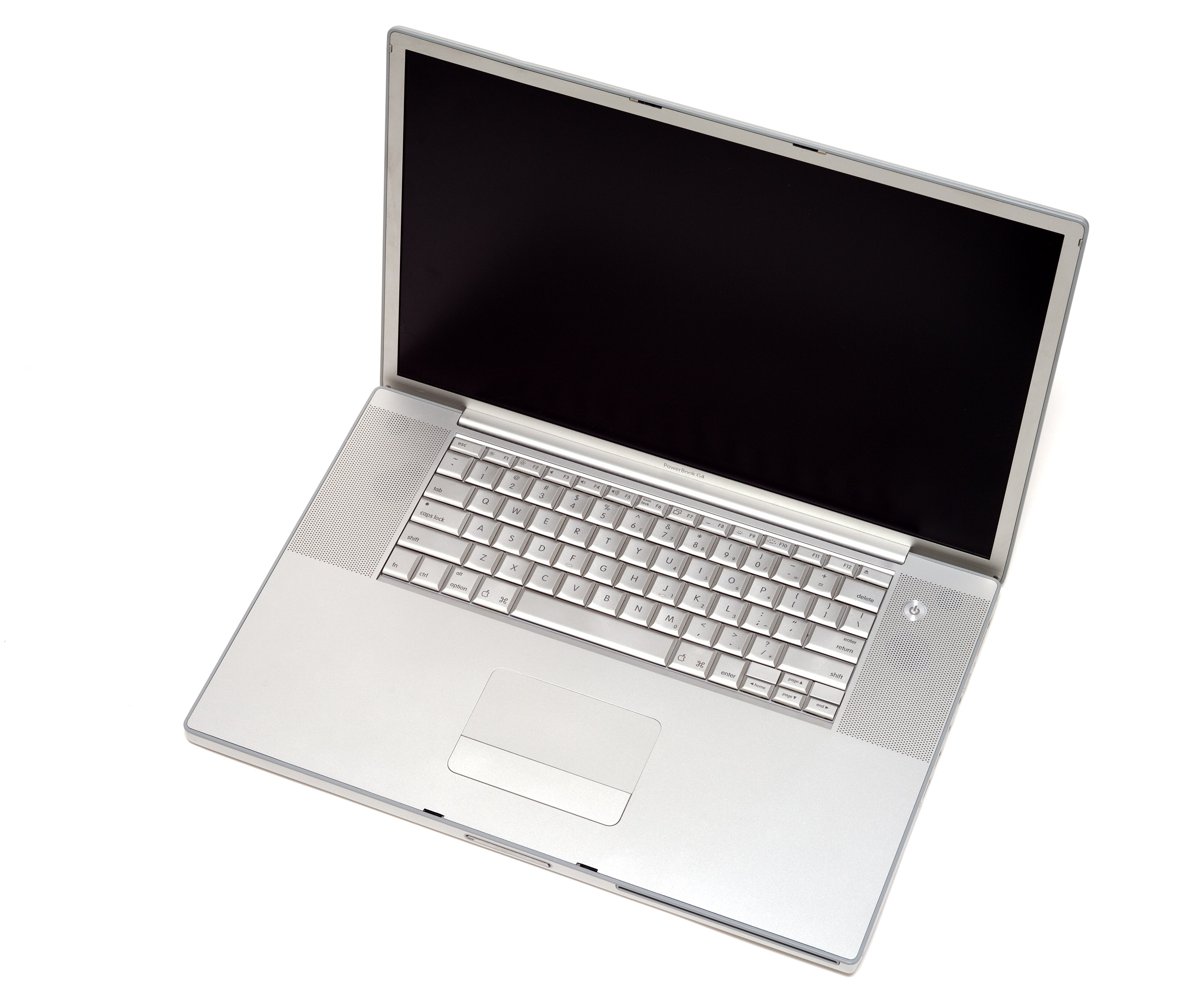
- An aluminum PowerBook G4 with a 17-inch screen
- Developer: Apple Computer
- Type: Laptop
- Released: January 7, 2003
- Discontinued: February 28, 2006 (15"); April 24, 2006 (17"); May 16, 2006 (12")
- CPU: PowerPC G4, 867 MHz – 1.67 GHz

In 2003, Apple introduced a new line of PowerBook G4s with 12-, 15-, and 17-inch screens and aluminum cases. The new notebooks not only brought a different design to the PowerBook G4 line but also laid down the foundation for Apple's notebook design for the next five years, replaced initially in January 2008 by the MacBook Air and the subsequent MacBook and MacBook Pro redesigns in October. The 15" titanium model was still available until September 16, 2003, when the aluminum model replaced it. Notably, the 12" model brought a welcome return to the Apple subnotebook configuration, conspicuously lacking in their product line since the discontinuation of the PowerBook 2400c in 1998. While the titanium PowerBook G4s were capable of booting into Mac OS 9 or Mac OS X operating systems, the aluminum PowerBook G4s could only boot into Mac OS X. Both series of machines could run Mac OS 9 in Classic mode from within Mac OS X.

=== Industrial design ===
The aluminum PowerBook G4 was designed by Apple's Vice President of Industrial Design, Jonathan Ive, and used a radically different design from the preceding titanium models. The most obvious change was the use of aluminum instead of titanium to manufacture the body. The keyboard, which was originally black, was changed to match the color of the body. Additionally, the aluminum keyboard was backlit on the 17" model and on one of the 15" models. This was the first case of keyboard internal backlighting seen on a notebook computer. The design was considered superior to most other notebooks when it debuted in 2003, and consequently, it made the PowerBook G4 one of the most desirable notebooks on the market. The external design of Apple's professional laptops continued to remain similar to the aluminum PowerBook G4 until Apple announced the Unibody Macbook Pro at its special event on October 14, 2008.

=== Reception ===
CNET's Molly Wood described the 17-inch PowerBook as a "rock star's notebook", praising its design, screen, bundled software suite (which included iLife, QuickBooks, OmniOutliner and OmniGraffle), and backlit keyboard, though she said that the keyboard backlighting required the room to be quite dark, and that there was no option to increase its sensitivity. In benchmarks, she found that the 12-inch, 15-inch and 17-inch models all had about the same "acceptable" battery life, and that the PowerBooks had similar performance to the 17-inch iMac desktop.

=== Quality issues ===
Some owners have experienced failure of the lower memory slot on some of the 15" models, with the typical repair being the replacement of the logic board. Apple had started a Repair Extension Program concerning the issue, but it has been noted that some models displaying the issue have not been included. This leaves some PowerBook G4 owners with a maximum of only 1 GB of RAM to use instead of a full 2 GB.

Apple previously had a Repair Extension Program to fix the "white spot" issue on its 15" PowerBook displays.

There has also been a rash of reports concerning sudden and pervasive sleeping of 1.5 and 1.67 GHz models known as Narcoleptic Aluminum PowerBook Syndrome. Symptoms include the PowerBook suddenly entering sleep mode, regardless of the battery level or whether the PowerBook is plugged in. One cause is the ambient light sensing, and associated instruction set coding, with possible keyboard backlight and sleep light issues accompanying the so-called "narcolepsy". Another cause is the trackpad area heat sensor; system logs report "Power Management received emergency overtemp signal. Going to sleep.".

To correct this, service groups will often replace the logic board or power converter, but the actual fix (depending on the model) for the first cause is to replace or remove the left or right ambient light sensors; and for the second cause, disconnect, remove, or replace the heat sensor, or the entire top case, which holds the trackpad heat sensor. Alternatively, there are reports that detail success in removing certain sensor kernel extensions or rebuilding the kernel using the Darwin Open Source project after commenting out the relevant sleepSystem() call; permanent resolution of the sleep issue in this manner is little documented.

The 1.67 GHz model may suffer from manufacturing or design defects in its display. Initial reports pointed to this only being a problem with type M9689 17" PowerBooks introduced in Q2 2005, but then this problem was also seen in displays replaced by Apple Service Providers in this period (e.g. because of the bright spots issue). The devices were the last 17" models shipped with the matte 1440×900 pixel low-resolution display. After many months of usage, the displays may show permanently shining lines of various colors stretching vertically across the LCD. Often this will start with one-pixel-wide vertical lines being "stuck" in an "always-on" mode. Various sites have been set up documenting this issue.

=== Battery recall ===
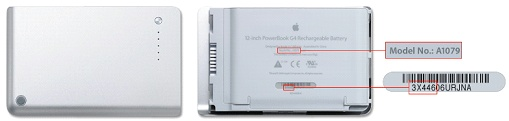
Model and serial number location on PowerBook battery

On May 20, 2005, Apple and the Consumer Product Safety Commission announced the recall of some Apple PowerBook G4 batteries. These batteries were manufactured by Sony; Dell, Toshiba, Lenovo, HP, Fujitsu and Acer laptops were also affected by the defective batteries. The joint Apple/CPSC press release stated that an internal short could cause the battery cells to overheat, posing a fire hazard. Approximately 128,000 defective units were sold. Though the problems first appeared to be solved, they continued for many users. In early August 2006, Engadget reported that a PowerBook had "violently exploded" because of faulty battery. On August 24, 2006, Apple and the CPSC announced an additional recall of more batteries for the same PowerBook models. About 1.1 million battery packs in the United States were recalled; an additional 700,000 were sold outside the U.S.

=== Technical specifications ===
According to Apple, all of these models are obsolete.

Model		Early 2003		Late 2003			Early 2004			Early 2005				Late 2005	
Timetable	Introduced	January 7, 2003		September 16, 2003			April 19, 2004			January 31, 2005				October 19, 2005	
Timetable	Discontinued	September 16, 2003		April 19, 2004			January 31, 2005			October 19, 2005	May 16, 2006	October 19, 2005		January 10, 2006	April 26, 2006
Identifiers	Model number	A1010 (EMC 1931)	A1013 (EMC N/A)	A1010 (EMC 1986)	A1046 (EMC 1960)	A1052 (EMC N/A)	A1010 (EMC 1986)	A1095 (EMC N/A)	A1085 (EMC 1983A)	A1104 (EMC 2030)		A1106 (EMC 2029)	A1107 (EMC N/A)	A1138 (EMC N/A)	A1139 (EMC N/A)
Identifiers	Model identifier	PowerBook6,1	PowerBook5,1	PowerBook6,2 (DVI)	PowerBook5,2 (FW800)	PowerBook5,3	PowerBook6,4	PowerBook5,4	PowerBook5,5	PowerBook6,8		PowerBook5,6 (SMS/BT2)	PowerBook5,7	PowerBook5,8 (DLSD/HR)	PowerBook5,9 (DLSD/HR)
Identifiers	Order	M8760	M8793	M9007	M9008	M8981	M9183	M9184	M9422	M9690	M9691	M9676	M9677	M9969	M9970
Display		12.1" 1024×768 TFT LCD	17" 1440×900 TFT LCD	12.1" 1024×768 TFT LCD	15.2" 1280×854 TFT LCD	17" 1440×900 TFT LCD	12.1" 1024×768 TFT LCD	15.2" 1280×854 TFT LCD	17" 1440×900 TFT LCD	12.1" 1024×768 TFT LCD		15.2" 1280x854 TFT LCD	17" 1440×900 TFT LCD	15.2" 1440×960 TFT LCD	17" 1680×1050 TFT LCD
Processor	CPU	PowerPC 7455 v3.3 (G4)		PowerPC 7447 (G4)			PowerPC 7447A (G4)			PowerPC 7447B (G4)					
Processor	Speed	867 MHz	1 GHz			1.33 GHz			1.5 GHz				1.67 GHz		
Processor	Backside cache	256 KB L2 backside cache	256 KB L2 backside cache 1 MB L3 backside cache	512 KB L2 backside cache											
Memory	Base	256 MB (two 128 MB) 266 MHz PC-2100 DDR SDRAM	512 MB (two 256 MB) 333 MHz PC-2700 DDR SDRAM	256 MB (soldered) 266 MHz PC-2100 DDR SDRAM	256 MB (two 128 MB) 333 MHz PC-2700 DDR SDRAM	512 MB (two 256 MB) 333 MHz PC-2700 DDR SDRAM	256 MB (soldered) 333 MHz PC-2700 DDR SDRAM	512 MB (two 256 MB) 333 MHz PC-2700 DDR SDRAM						512 MB 533 MHz PC2-4200 DDR2 SDRAM	
Memory	Expansion	Expandable to 1152 MB	Expandable to 2 GB	Expandable to 1.25 GB	Expandable to 2 GB		Expandable to 1.25 GB	Expandable to 2 GB		Expandable to 1.25 GB		Expandable to 2 GB			
Graphics	Processor	NVIDIA GeForce4 Go 420 32 MB DDR SDRAM	NVIDIA GeForce4 Go 440 64 MB DDR SDRAM	NVIDIA GeForce FX Go5200 32 MB DDR SDRAM	ATI Radeon 9600 64 MB DDR SDRAM		NVIDIA GeForce FX Go5200 64 MB DDR SDRAM	ATI Radeon 9700 64 MB DDR SDRAM; Optionally with 128 MB DDR SDRAM		NVIDIA GeForce FX Go5200 64 MB DDR SDRAM		ATI Radeon 9700 64 MB DDR SDRAM; Optionally with 128 MB DDR SDRAM		ATI Radeon 9700 128 MB DDR SDRAM	
Graphics	Ports	AGP 4x													
Hard drive	Capacity	40 GB 4200 rpm	60 GB 4200 rpm	40 GB 4200 rpm	60 GB 4200 rpm	80 GB 4200 rpm	60 GB 4200 rpm	80 GB 4200 rpm		60 GB 5400 rpm	80 GB 4200 rpm		100 GB 4200 rpm	80 GB	120 GB
Hard drive	Types	Ultra ATA/100													
Optical Drive Slot Loading		Combo drive	SuperDrive	Combo drive	Combo drive	SuperDrive	Combo drive	Combo drive	SuperDrive	Combo drive	SuperDrive	Combo drive	SuperDrive	DL SuperDrive	
Connectivity	AirPort	Optional or Integrated AirPort Extreme 802.11b/g				Integrated AirPort Extreme 802.11b/g									
Connectivity	Ethernet	10/100 BASE-T	Gigabit	10/100 BASE-T	Gigabit		10/100 BASE-T	Gigabit		10/100 BASE-T		Gigabit			
Connectivity	Modem	56k V.92 modem													
Connectivity	Bluetooth	Bluetooth 1.1				Bluetooth 2.0+EDR									
Peripherals	USB	2x USB 1.1		2x USB 2.0											
Peripherals	FireWire	1x FireWire 400	1x FireWire 800	1x FireWire 400	1x FireWire 800		1x FireWire 400	1x FireWire 800		1x FireWire 400		1x FireWire 800			
Peripherals	PC Card	—N/a	PC Card I/II	—N/a		PC Card I/II		—N/a		PC Card I/II		—N/a		PC Card I/II	
Peripherals	Audio	Built-in stereo speakers Audio input mini-jack Audio output mini-jack											Built-in stereo speakers Analog/optical digital audio input mini-jack Analog/optical digital audio output mini-jack		
Video out		Mini-VGA	DVI	Mini-DVI	DVI		Mini-DVI	DVI		Mini-DVI		DVI			
Battery		47 Wh removable lithium-ion	55 Wh removable lithium-ion	47 Wh removable lithium-ion	46 Wh removable lithium-ion	58 Wh removable lithium-ion	50 Wh removable lithium-ion (12" and 15"); 58 Wh removable lithium-ion (17")								
Operating system	Original	Mac OS X 10.2.3 "Jaguar"		Mac OS X 10.2.7 "Jaguar"			Mac OS X 10.3.3 "Panther"			Mac OS X 10.3.7 "Panther"				Mac OS X 10.4.2 "Tiger"	
Operating system	Maximum	Mac OS X 10.5.8 “Leopard”													

== Discontinuation ==
One major factor that led to the discontinuation of the PowerBook G4 was Apple's internal experimentation with the PowerPC G5 for the company's next line professional-grade notebooks at that time. Moreover, the G5, which also powered the Power Mac G5 and iMac G5, proved to be too power-hungry and heat-intensive to use in a notebook form factor. Stalled development of the mobile G5 is also said to be another main factor in the Mac's transition from PowerPC to Intel processors.

Following a long wait for a new professional-grade notebook to replace the G4, on January 10, 2006, Apple released the 15" MacBook Pro, its first Intel-based notebook. A 17" version of the MacBook Pro followed on April 24, 2006. The new "MacBook Pro" name was given to the new series of notebooks after Apple changed the portable naming schemes from "Power" for professional products (and "i" for consumer products), in favor of including "Mac" in the title of all computer lines, with the suffix "Pro" denoting a pro product. Finally, on May 16, 2006, the 12" PowerBook G4 and the G4 iBook were discontinued and replaced by the 13.3" MacBook, ending the whole PowerBook line.

Nonetheless, a replacement for the 12" subnotebook form factor (i.e. the 12" PowerBook G4) was not immediately forthcoming; the MacBook Air, released in 2008, served as an indirect replacement while the 13" MacBook Pro released in 2009 is the direct replacement for the 12" PowerBook G4. Apple returned to the 12" screen size with the MacBook released in 2015.

== Supported operating systems ==
Supported Mac OS releases
OS release	Titanium				Aluminum				
OS release	Early 2001	Late 2001	Early 2002	Late 2002	Early 2003	Late 2003	Early 2004	Early 2005	Late 2005
Mac OS 9	9.1	9.2.1	9.2.2		Emulation only				
10.0 Cheetah	Yes	—N/a	—N/a	—N/a	—N/a	—N/a	—N/a	—N/a	—N/a
10.1 Puma	Yes	Yes	10.1.4	—N/a	—N/a	—N/a	—N/a	—N/a	—N/a
10.2 Jaguar	Yes	Yes	Yes	10.2.1	10.2.3	10.2.7	—N/a	—N/a	—N/a
10.3 Panther	Yes	Yes	Yes	Yes	Yes	Yes	10.3.3	10.3.7	—N/a
10.4 Tiger	Yes	Yes	Yes	Yes	Yes	Yes	Yes	Yes	10.4.2
10.5 Leopard (Note: Mac OS X Leopard is the final release to support PowerPC Macs.)	patch	patch	patch	Yes	Yes	Yes	Yes	Yes	Yes

== Timeline ==
Timeline of portable Macintoshes
See also: List of Mac models
