= PowerBook G3 =

Line of laptop computers by Apple Computer

The PowerBook G3 is a series of laptop Macintosh personal computers that were designed, manufactured, and sold by Apple Computer from 1997 to 2001. It was the first laptop to use the PowerPC G3 (PPC740/750) series of microprocessors, and was marketed as the fastest laptop in the world for its entire production run. The PowerBook G3 was succeeded by the PowerBook G4.

The G3 was the first black Apple laptop, and was succeeded in this by the black MacBook in 2006. Previous PowerBooks were dark gray.

The Wallstreet, Lombard, and Pismo models were praised for their straightforward upgrade options, not only for accessible drives and memory but also for their CPU daughtercards that could be detached from the logic boards. This encouraged the aftermarket, including Sonnet, Powerlogix, Wegener Media, and others, to offer G3 CPU upgrades across various series. In some instances, they even provided G4 upgrades, allowing these machines to rival or exceed the performance of Apple's contemporary 'G4 Titanium' PowerBooks of that era.

== Kanga ==
PowerBook G3
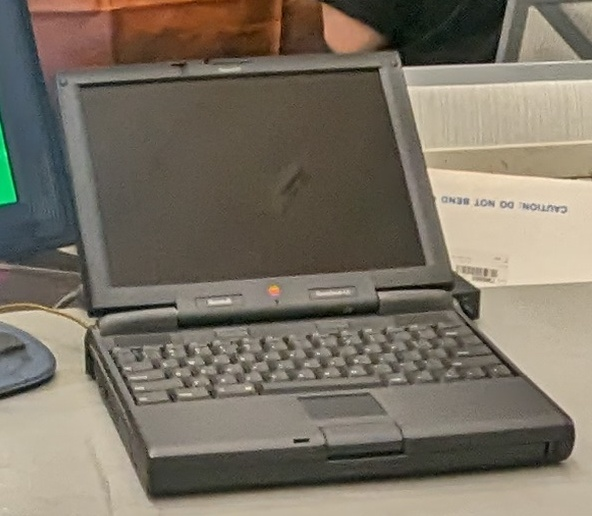
- PowerBook G3 "Kanga"
- Codename: Kanga, PowerBook 3500
- Developer: Apple Computer
- Product family: PowerBook
- Type: Laptop
- Released: November 10, 1997; 28 years ago
- Introductory price: US$5,700 (equivalent to $11,400 in 2025)
- Discontinued: January 1998
- Operating system: Mac OS 8.0 – 9.1
- CPU: PowerPC 750 @ 250 MHz
- Memory: 32 MB, expandable to 160 MB (60 ns EDO DIMM)
- Storage: 5 GB
- Removable storage: 1.44 MB SuperDrive floppy, 20× CD-ROM
- Display: 12.1-in color active-matrix, 800 × 600, 16-bit
- Graphics: Chips and Technologies 65554
- Dimensions: 2.4 × 11.5 × 9.5 in (61 × 292 × 241 mm)
- Weight: 7.5 lb (3.4 kg)
- Predecessor: PowerBook 3400

Apple, seeking to retain its claim of offering the fastest notebook computer available, a title then held by the 240 MHz PowerPC 603ev-based PowerBook 3400, rushed the PowerBook G3, code-named Kanga, to market on November 10, 1997 at a price of US$5,700 (equivalent to $11,400 in 2025). Rather than wait for a redesigned enclosure, the company re-used the 3400's chassis, which itself was largely based on the design of 1995's PowerBook 5300.

The PowerBook G3 used a 250 MHz PowerPC 750 (G3) processor, which delivered significantly better performance than the 603ev. Compared with its predecessor, it increased the system bus speed from 40 to 50 MHz and included a 512 KB level 2 cache operating at 100 MHz, compared with the 3400's 256 KB cache operating at 40 MHz. Standard memory increased from 16 MB to 32 MB and was expandable to 160 MB. The integrated Chips and Technologies 65554 graphics controller retained the same architecture but doubled video memory from 1 MB to 2 MB. The hard drive capacity increased from 3 GB to 5 GB and offered improved transfer performance.

According to Macworld, these hardware changes enabled the PowerBook G3 to outperform the 240 MHz PowerBook 3400 by 71% in processor benchmarks, while graphics performance improved by 74%.

Macworld also noted that the computer retained the PowerBook 3400's 12.1-inch TFT SVGA display and its limitation of requiring a restart when connecting an external monitor because it did not support simultaneous dual-display operation.

Because it retained the older chassis design, it remained compatible with expansion bay modules, batteries, and other peripherals introduced for the PowerBook 190, 5300, and 3400. It is the only G3-based Macintosh that does not officially support Mac OS X.

The model was discontinued in January 1998 after less than five months on the market and was replaced by the redesigned PowerBook G3 Series ("Wallstreet"). Retrospective reviews have generally described the Kanga as a transitional model that enabled Apple to introduce a G3-based PowerBook before the redesigned Wallstreet series was ready.

=== Technical specifications ===
According to Apple, all of these models are obsolete. (Note: Apple products that have been discontinued for 7 years and no longer receive hardware support or spare parts)

Formal name		PowerBook G3
Code names		Kanga; PowerBook 3500
Introduction		November 10, 1997
Discontinuation		March 14, 1998
Model	Number	M3553
Model	Gestalt ID	313
Model	Order no.	M5993
Display	Size	12.1-inch (310 mm)
Display	Type	TFT
Display	Resolution	16-bit color, 800 × 600, 83 ppi
Performance	Processor	PowerPC 750
Performance	Clock speed	250 MHz
Performance	L1 cache	64 KB
Performance	L2 cache	512 KB via 100 MHz backside bus
Performance	RAM	32 MB (60 ns EDO DIMM); Expandable to 160 MB
Performance	Graphics	Chips and Technologies 65554 with 2 MB of SGRAM
Storage	Hard drive	5 GB
Storage	Optical drive	20× CD-ROM
Connections	Connectivity	10BASE-T Ethernet; 33.6k modem
Connections	Peripherals	1× ADB; 1× Serial GeoPort; 2× PC Card II (1× PC Card III); 1× HDI-30 SCSI; Audio out mini-jack
Connections	Video out	VGA
Battery		47-watt-hour removable lithium-ion
Operating system	Original	Mac OS 8.0
Operating system	Maximum	Mac OS 9.1
Dimensions	Weight	7.5 lb (3.4 kg)
Dimensions	H × W × D	2.4 × 11.5 × 9.5 in (61 × 292 × 241 mm)

== Wallstreet ==
PowerBook G3 Series
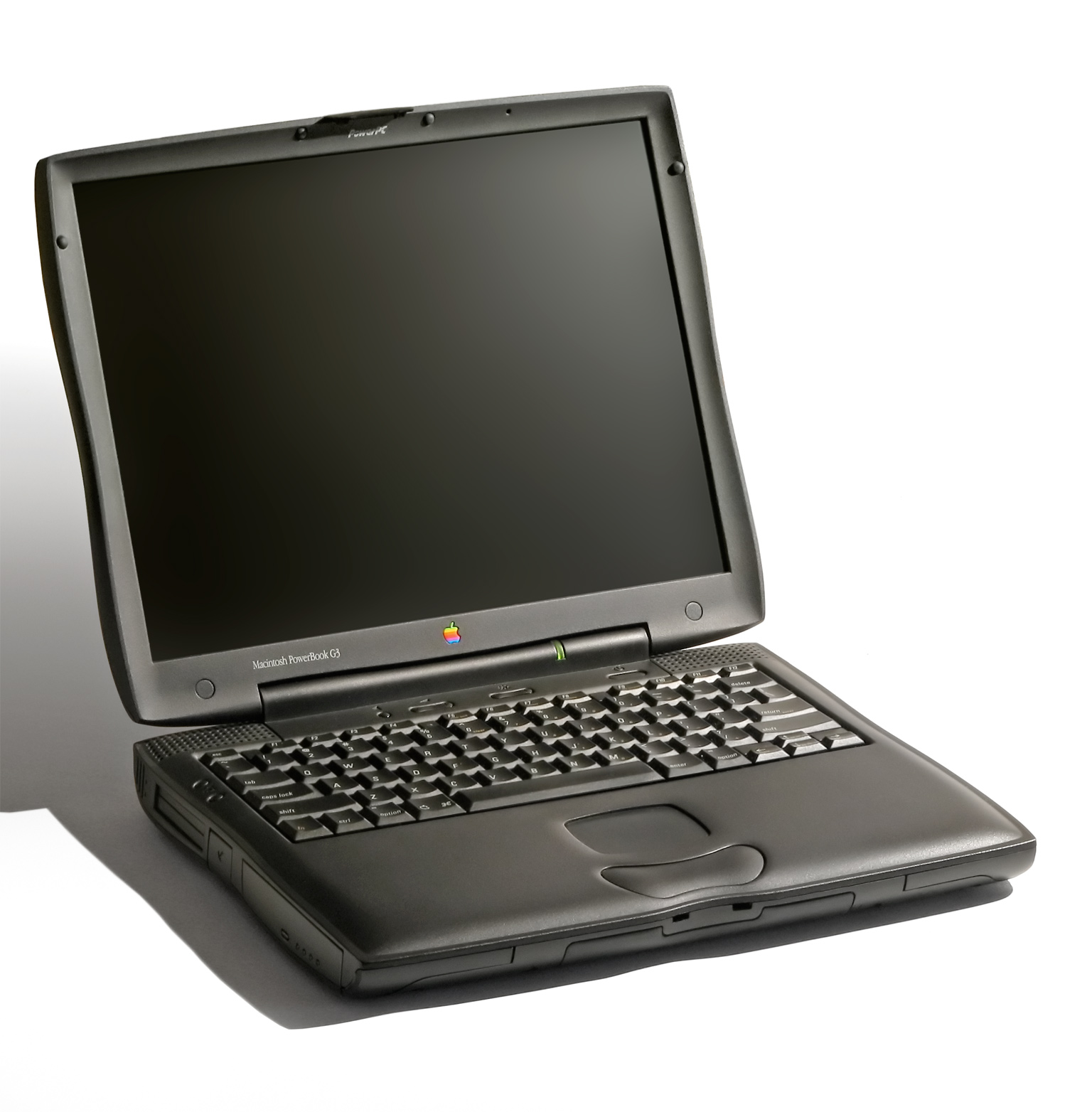
- "Wallstreet II/PDQ" PowerBook
- Codename: Wallstreet, Mainstreet, Wallstreet II/PDQ ("Pretty Darn Quick")
- Developer: Apple Computer
- Product family: PowerBook
- Type: Laptop
- Released: May 6, 1998; 28 years ago
- Introductory price: US$2,299 (equivalent to $4,500 in 2025)
- Discontinued: May 10, 1999
- Operating system: Mac OS 9 & Mac OS X
- CPU: PowerPC 750 @ 233, 250, 266, 292 or 300 MHz
- Predecessor: PowerBook 1400c PowerBook 2400c PowerBook 3400c
- Made in: Taiwan, Ireland (until late 1998), USA (from 2000)

The second generation of PowerBook G3s, now called the PowerBook G3 Series, was introduced in May 1998. The machine was completely redesigned with a new case that was lighter and more rounded than the previous PowerBook G3; however, it was still an Old World ROM Macintosh. The new PowerBooks, code-named Wallstreet, came in three screen sizes: a 12" passive matrix LCD, a 13.3-inch TFT LCD, and a 14.1-inch TFT LCD. The 12.1" models had 2 MB VRAM on board, while the 13.3" and 14.1" models were equipped with 4 MB VRAM allowing for 'millions of colors' at maximum resolution (1024×768 for both; the 13.3" having a higher pixel density). The 13.3" display came with a quick-to-fail ribbon cable that was produced too short, leading to a swath of warranty repairs that led Apple to remove the 13.3" model from the lineup after the initial production run. The Wallstreet was the first PowerBook to use industry-standard ATA optical drives. This change meant that CD and DVD recorders designed for Wintel machines could more easily be used in this computer, often at a price far less than those manufactured by Apple. It also came in three CPU speeds: 233 MHz, 250 MHz, and 292 MHz. The 233 MHz model was sometimes nicknamed Mainstreet, as it lacked L2 cache, making it far slower than the other two in the lineup. The 250 MHz and 292 MHz models shipped with 1 MB of cache. Because of this large cache, as well as the swifter system bus, the Wallstreets were known to suffer from some heat issues. Many of the problems of the Wallstreet PowerBook G3s were fixed in the next revision, the Wallstreet II. The WallStreet I was the last PowerBook assembled by Apple in Cork, Ireland.

=== Wallstreet II/PDQ ===
The Wallstreet design was updated in August 1998, codenamed Wallstreet II or PDQ, for "Pretty Darn Quick". It featured a 14.1-inch display on 266 MHz and 300 MHz models. The 233 MHz machine was now equipped with a vastly improved TFT panel (compared to the passive matrix of the 12.1" Wallstreet I series), as well as a 512 KB backside cache allowing for far superior performance at the same 233 MHz, though it was equipped with 2 MB onboard VRAM compared to the 4 MB on the faster 14.1" models. The 13.3" display was removed from the line, owing to both the falling production costs of the larger TFT and the near-guaranteed failure of the 13.3" models' ribbon cable through the hinge; it was produced slightly too short, and many failed soon after purchase. Processor speeds were bumped on the faster two models, resulting in 233 MHz, 266 MHz, and 300 MHz models.

The case has two docking bays, one on each side. The left-hand bay can accommodate a battery, a 3.5" floppy disk, a third-party Iomega Zip drive, or a third-party add-on hard drive. The right-hand bay is larger and can accommodate any of the above, plus a 5.25" optical drive (CD-ROM or DVD-ROM). A small internal nickel–cadmium battery allowed swapping of the main batteries while the computer "slept". With a battery in each bay, battery life was doubled. DVDs can be displayed with the use of a hardware decoder built into a CardBus (PCMCIA) card.

The PowerBook G3 Series was Apple's first notebook offering that matched the build-to-order customization of the Power Mac G3 desktop line. It was discontinued in May 1999. It is the last Apple computer ever to bear the rainbow-colored Apple logo, and the last Mac to support Apple's SuperDrive. It was also the last Old World ROM model in the PowerBook series. The PDQ series was entirely produced in Taiwan, and the machine's manufacture labels (showing production in Ireland or Taiwan) on the underside of the machines can be used to identify between otherwise nearly identical Wallstreet and PDQ series for collectors and enthusiasts.

The 12.1" and 13.3" Wallstreet I and PDQ series shared a more curved top case at all corners; the lid and its corners were flattened and squared off for the larger LCD of the 14.1" model, resulting in a bulkier appearance. Many press releases and visual media at the time relied on the more 'attractive' curvature of the case on those smaller-display models, regardless of the 14.1" model's superior and more upmarket display.

=== Technical specifications ===
According to Apple, all of these models are obsolete.

Formal name		PowerBook G3 Series (1st)					PowerBook G3 Series (2nd)				
Code name		Wallstreet; Mainstreet			Wallstreet		Wallstreet II; PDQ (Pretty Darn Quick)				
Timetable	Introduction	May 6, 1998					October 1, 1998	September 1, 1998			October 1, 1998
Timetable	Discontinuation	September 1, 1998					May 10, 1999				
Model	Model number	M4753									
Model	Gestalt ID	314			312		406				
Model	Model identifier										
Model	Order number	M6477, M6359	M6481	M6484	M6357	M6541	M7229	M7109	M7110	M7111	M7310
Display	Size	12.1 in (310 mm)	13.3 in (340 mm)	14.1 in (360 mm)	13.3 in (340 mm)	14.1 in (360 mm)	12.1 in (310 mm)	14.1 in (360 mm)			
Display	Type	STN Passive matrix	TFT								
Display	Resolution	24-bit color, 800 × 600	24-bit color, 1024 × 768				24-bit color, 800 × 600	24-bit color, 1024 × 768			
Performance	Processor	PowerPC 750									
Performance	Clock speed	233 MHz			250 MHz	292 MHz	233 MHz	233 MHz	266 MHz	300 MHz	
Performance	L1 cache	64 KB									
Performance	L2 cache	None			1 MB via 125 MHz backside bus	1 MB via 146 MHz backside bus	512 KB via 116 MHz backside bus		1 MB via 133 MHz backside bus	1 MB via 150 MHz backside bus	
Performance	RAM	32 MB PC100 SDRAM; Expandable to 192 MB (Apple) or 512 MB				64 MB PC100 SDRAM; Expandable to 192 MB (Apple) or 512 MB	32 MB PC100 SDRAM; Expandable to 192 MB (Apple) or 512 MB		64 MB PC100 SDRAM; Expandable to 192 MB (Apple) or 512 MB		
Performance	Graphics	ATI Rage LT with 2 MB or 4 MB of SGRAM				ATI Rage LT with 4 MB of SGRAM	ATI Rage Pro LT with 2 MB of SGRAM	ATI Rage Pro LT with 4 MB of SGRAM			
Storage	Hard drive	2 GB			4 GB	8 GB	2 GB	2 GB	4 GB	8 GB	
Storage	Optical drive	20× CD-ROM					20× CD-ROM; Optional 1× DVD-ROM	20× CD-ROM; Optional 1× DVD-ROM		1× DVD-ROM	20× CD-ROM
Connections	Connectivity	10BASE-T Ethernet; 56k modem									
Connections	Peripherals	1× ADB; 1× Serial GeoPort; 2× PC Card II (1× PC Card III); 1× HDI-30 SCSI; Audio out mini-jack									
Connections	Video out	VGA			VGA and S-Video						
Battery		49-watt-hour removable lithium-ion (1 or 2)									
Operating system	Original	Mac OS 8.0					Mac OS 8.1				
Operating system	Maximum	Mac OS X 10.2.8 "Jaguar", Mac OS 9.2.2 and Mac OS X Server 1.2									
Dimensions	Weight	7.2 lb (3.3 kg)			7.6 lb (3.4 kg)		7.2 lb. (3.3 kg)	7.8 lb (3.5 kg)			
Dimensions	Volume	2.0 × 12.7 × 10.4 in (51 × 323 × 264 mm)									

== Bronze Keyboard/Lombard ==
PowerBook G3 Series (Bronze Keyboard)
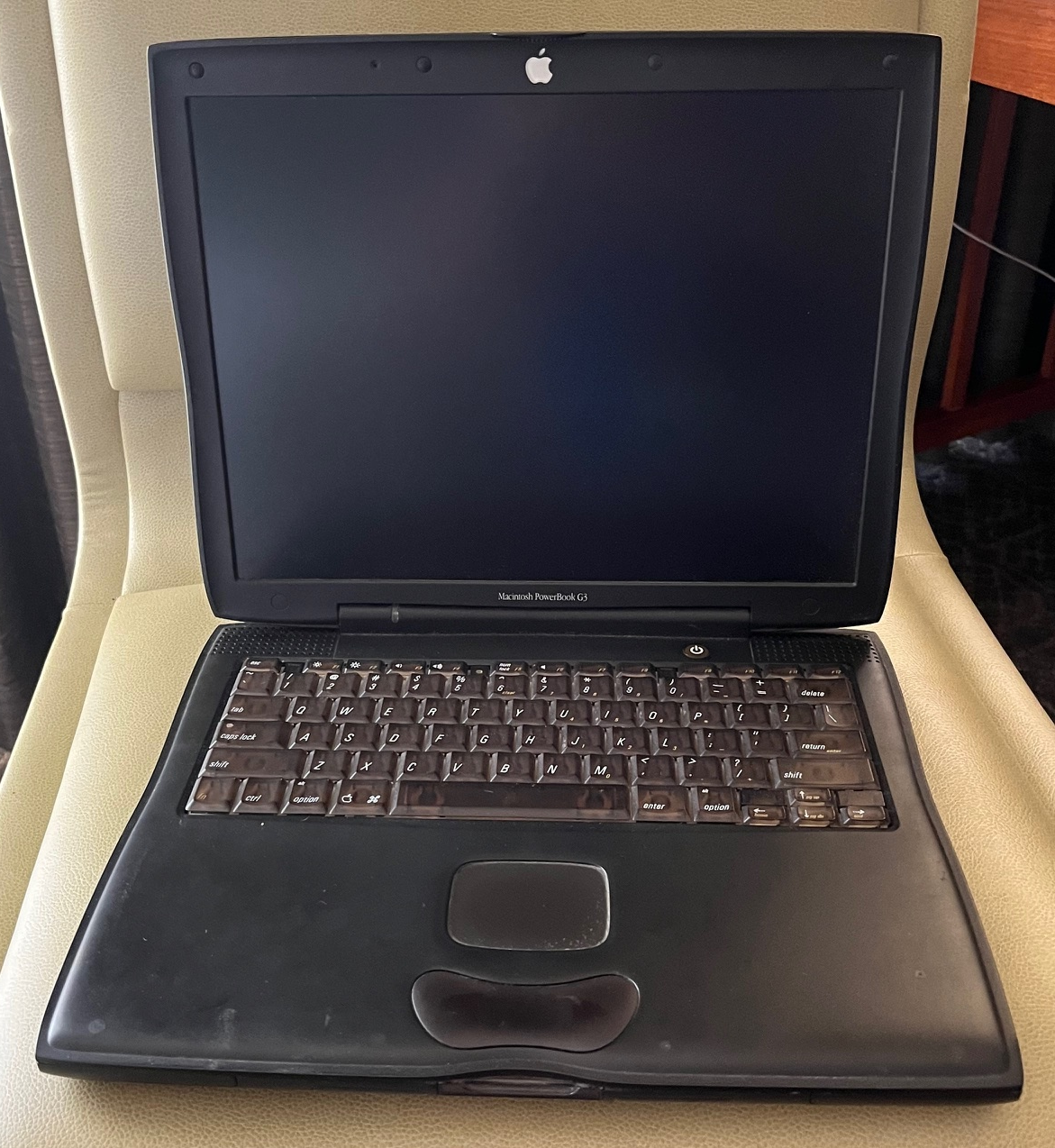
- PowerBook G3 Series (Bronze Keyboard)
- Codename: Lombard
- Developer: Apple Computer
- Product family: PowerBook
- Type: Laptop
- Released: May 10, 1999; 27 years ago
- Introductory price: US$2,499 (equivalent to $4,800 in 2025)
- Discontinued: February 16, 2000
- Operating system: Mac OS 8.6 – 10.3.9
- CPU: PowerPC 750 @ 333 or 400 MHz

The third generation of PowerBook G3 (Lombard) was introduced in May 1999. It was much slimmer and lighter than its predecessor and was the first New World ROM PowerBook. It had longer battery life, and as with the Wallstreet II, the user could double the duration to 10 hours by substituting a second battery for the optical drive in the expansion bay. The keyboard was also improved and now featured translucent bronze-tinted plastics, which is the origin of the "bronze keyboard" nickname. It was also the first Apple laptop to have a glowing Apple logo on the back.

Internal hard drives for the Pismo, Lombard, and Wallstreet II can be used interchangeably. The expansion bay drives (DVD, CD, floppy, battery) are interchangeable on the Pismo and Lombard, but not on the Wallstreet. A DVD drive was optional on the 333 MHz model and standard on the 400 MHz version. The 400 MHz model included a hardware MPEG-2 decoder for DVD playback, while the 333 MHz model was left without (except for the PC card one used by Wallstreet). Further DVD playback optimizations enabled both models to play back DVDs without use of hardware assistance. This model introduced USB ports to the PowerBook line while retaining SCSI support and eliminating ADB entirely (although the keyboard and touchpad still used an ADB interface internally). Graphics were provided by an ATI Rage LT Pro chipset on the PCI bus, to drive its 14.1-inch LCD at a maximum resolution of 1024×768.

Mac OS 8.6–10.3.9 are supported by Apple, but 10.4 is not, although OS X will not install (except for 10.0) if both RAM slots are not occupied with identical size RAM. The use of XPostFacto 4 enables users to upgrade to Tiger, and it runs quite well for an unsupported machine. More RAM (up to 512 MB), a greater hard drive (up to 128 GB), and CPU upgrades (up to a 433 MHz G4) are available for these PowerBooks.

=== Technical specifications ===
According to Apple, all of these models are obsolete.

Formal name		PowerBook G3 Series (Bronze keyboard)	
Code name		Lombard	
Timetable	Introduction	May 10, 1999	
Timetable	Discontinuation	February 16, 2000	
Model	Model number	M5343	
Model	Model identifier	PowerBook 1,1	
Model	Order number	M7304	M7308
Display	Size	14.1 in (360 mm)	
Display	Type	TFT	
Display	Resolution	24-bit color, 1024 × 768	
Performance	Processor	PowerPC 750	
Performance	Clock speed	333 MHz	400 MHz
Performance	L1 cache	64 KB	
Performance	L2 cache	512 KB via 133 MHz backside bus	1 MB via 160 MHz backside bus
Performance	RAM	64 MB of PC100 SDRAM; Expandable to 384 MB (Apple) or 512 MB	
Performance	Graphics	ATI Rage Pro LT with 8 MB of SDRAM	
Storage	Hard drive	4 GB	6 GB
Storage	Optical drive	24× CD-ROM or 2× DVD-ROM	
Connections	Connectivity	10/100BASE-T Ethernet; 56k modem	
Connections	Peripherals	2× USB 1.1; 2× PC Card II (1× PC Card III) (333 MHz) or 1× PC Card II (400 MHz); 1× HDI-30 SCSI; Audio out mini-jack	
Connections	Video out	VGA and S-Video	
Battery		50-watt-hour removable lithium-ion (1 or 2)	
Operating system	Original	Mac OS 8.6	
Operating system	Maximum	Mac OS X 10.3.9 "Panther" and Mac OS 9.2.2	
Dimensions	Weight	6.1 lb (2.8 kg)	
Dimensions	Volume	1.7 × 12.7 × 10.4 in (43 × 323 × 264 mm)	

== FireWire/Pismo ==
PowerBook (FireWire)
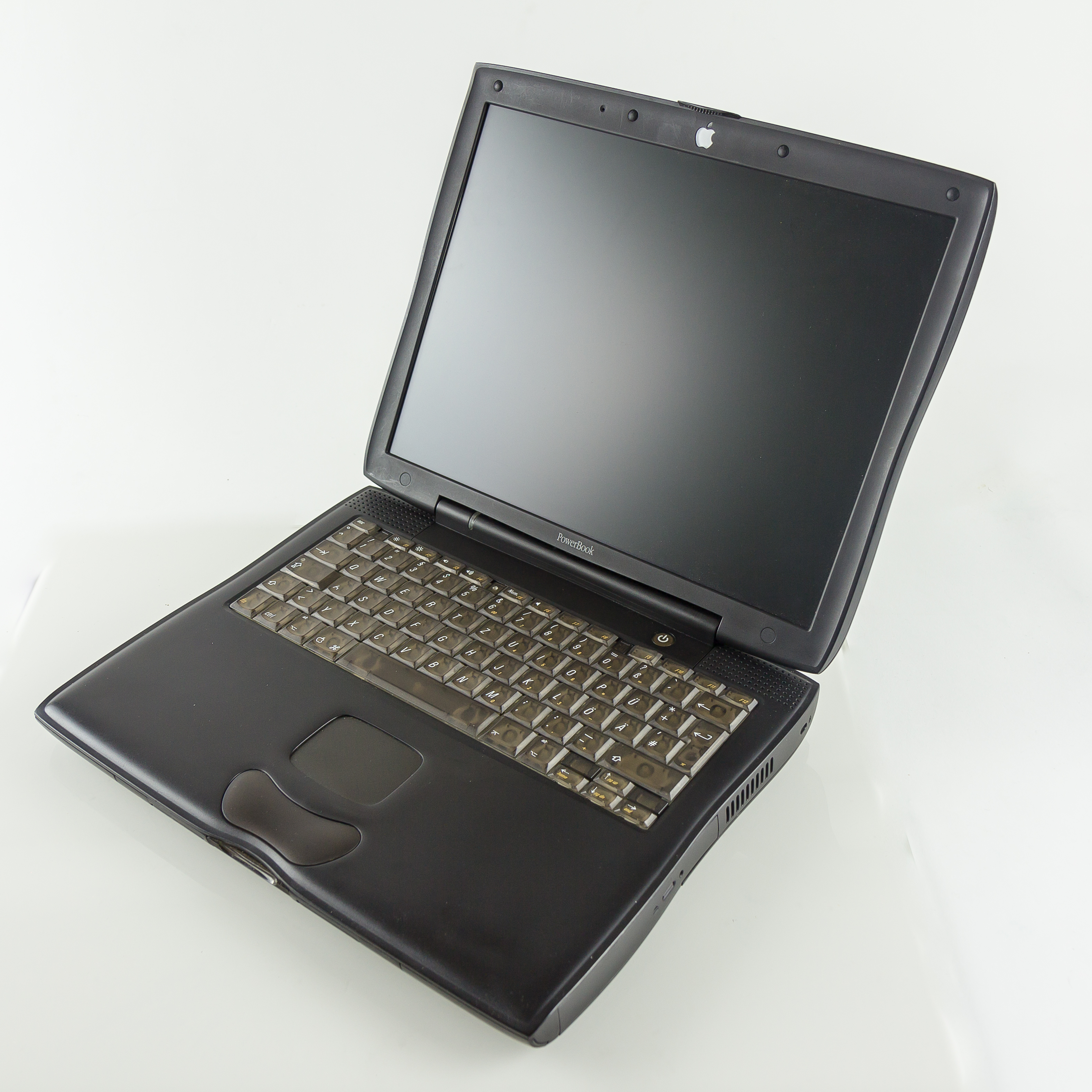
- PowerBook (FireWire)
- Codename: Pismo
- Developer: Apple Computer
- Product family: PowerBook
- Type: Laptop
- Released: February 16, 2000; 26 years ago
- Introductory price: US$2,499 (equivalent to $4,700 in 2025)
- Discontinued: January 9, 2001
- Operating system: Mac OS 9.0.2 – 10.4.11
- CPU: PowerPC 750 @ 400 or 500 MHz
- Successor: PowerBook G4

The fourth generation of PowerBook G3 (Pismo) was introduced in February 2000. It was code-named "Pismo" after Pismo Beach, California. For this generation, Apple dropped "G3" from the name.

The original Pismo was rumored to be a latchless design, akin to the iBook, which is similar in specification. Apple settled on fitting the Pismo board into the form factor of the previous Lombard G3 PowerBook, but with many improvements. The Pismo was available at CPU speeds of 400 MHz or 500 MHz, with a front side bus speed of 100 MHz (50% swifter than the Lombard's front side bus); it also implemented a unified motherboard architecture, and replaced SCSI with the newer FireWire interface (IEEE-1394). The PCI graphics used on the Lombard were updated to an AGP-connected ATI Rage Mobility 128, though the video memory was kept at 8 MB, and could not be upgraded, and the screen's resolution was the same as well. A 6× DVD-ROM drive became standard. It was also the first PowerBook with AirPort networking as an official option (although it could be added to the earlier models via various third-party CardBus cards). The Pismo can be upgraded with additional RAM (officially 512 MB with then-available RAM, but it accepts 1 gigabyte) and a larger hard drive (up to 128 GB). Brighter screens and replacement batteries were also available.

The left expansion bay, like the Lombard, could take only a battery, but the right bay was able to accommodate a tray-loading or slot-loading Combo Drive or SuperDrive, a Zip 100 drive, a Zip 250 drive, an LS-120 SuperDisk drive, a VST floppy disk drive, a second hard drive (with adapter, which was tough to find), or a second battery. Lombard and Pismo accept the same expansion bay devices.

Versions of Mac OS from 9.0.2 through 10.4.11 are officially supported. For some time, G3 (750FX) CPU upgrades at speeds of up to 900 MHz and G4 (7410LE) upgrades up to 550 MHz were available. These upgrades are now out of production and must be purchased secondhand.

The Pismo was assembled by Quanta Computer in Taiwan, as well as by Apple Computer at their Elk Grove, California manufacturing plant.

The Pismo PowerBook was the last of the G3 line. It was succeeded by the PowerBook G4 Titanium models.

=== Technical specifications ===
According to Apple, all of these models are obsolete.

Formal name		PowerBook (Firewire)	
Code name		Pismo	
Timetable	Introduction	February 16, 2000	
Timetable	Discontinuation	January 9, 2001	
Model	Model number	M7572	
Model	Model identifier	PowerBook 3,1	
Model	Order number	M7630	M7633
Display	Size	14.1 in (360 mm)	
Display	Type	TFT	
Display	Resolution	24-bit color, 1024 × 768	
Performance	Processor	PowerPC 750	
Performance	Clock speed	400 MHz	500 MHz
Performance	L1 cache	64 KB	
Performance	L2 cache	1 MB via 160 MHz backside bus	1 MB via 200 MHz backside bus
Performance	RAM	64 or 128 MB of PC100 SDRAM; Expandable to 512 MB (Apple) or 1 GB	
Performance	Graphics	ATI Rage 128 with 8 MB of SDRAM	
Storage	Hard drive	4–6 GB	6–18 GB
Storage	Optical drive	6× DVD-ROM	
Connections	Connectivity	10/100BASE-T Ethernet; 56k modem Optional AirPort 802.11b	
Connections	Peripherals	2× USB 1.1; 2× FireWire 400; 1× PC Card I/II; Audio out mini-jack	
Connections	Video out	VGA and S-Video	
Battery		50-watt-hour removable lithium-ion (1 or 2)	
Operating system	Original	Mac OS 9.0.2	
Operating system	Maximum	Mac OS X 10.4.11 "Tiger" and Mac OS 9.2.2	
Dimensions	Weight	6.1 lb (2.8 kg)	
Dimensions	Volume	1.7 × 12.7 × 10.4 in (43 × 323 × 264 mm)	

== In popular culture ==
The PowerBook G3 was featured in many facets of popular culture from the late 1990s to the mid-2000s, including You've Got Mail, NewsRadio, Curb Your Enthusiasm, Austin Powers: The Spy Who Shagged Me, House on Haunted Hill, Mission: Impossible, Disney's The Kid, Dark Angel, What Women Want, The West Wing, Friends, The Lone Gunmen, The Core, Duplex, Saw, Sex and the City, How I Met Your Mother, Night at the Museum, Charmed, Everybody Loves Raymond, Stargate SG-1, That's So Raven and Angel.

== Timeline ==
Timeline of portable Macintoshes
See also: List of Mac models
