= PowerBook 3400c =

Laptop by Apple

PowerBook 3400c series
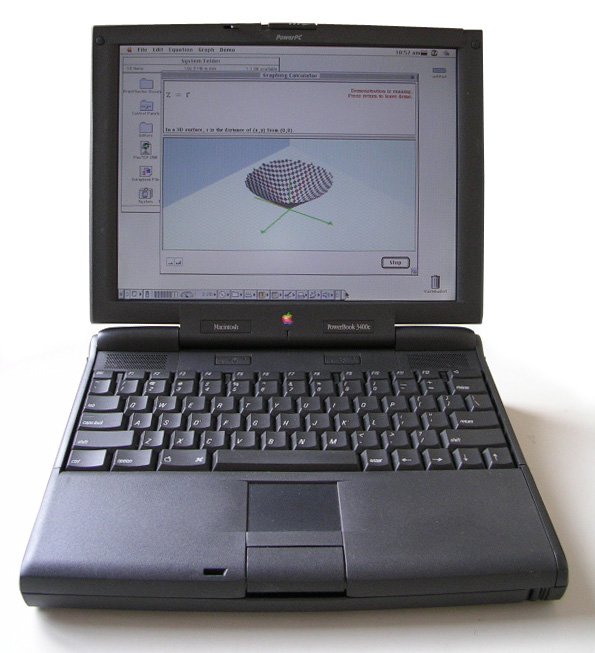
- Apple PowerBook 3400c/200
- Developer: Apple Computer
- Type: Laptop
- Released: February 17, 1997
- Introductory price: US$5,000 (equivalent to $10,028 in 2025) - US$5,500 (equivalent to $11,031 in 2025)
- Discontinued: November 7, 1997
- Operating system: Mac OS 7.6 – Mac OS 9.1
- CPU: PowerPC 603ev @ 180, 200 or 240 MHz
- Display: 12.1"
- Predecessor: PowerBook 5300
- Successor: PowerBook G3
- Related: PowerBook 1400; PowerBook 2400c

The PowerBook 3400c is a laptop computer in the PowerBook line manufactured by Apple Computer from February to November 1997. It was briefly the fastest laptop in the world. Using the PowerPC 603e processor running at speeds of up to 240 MHz, this PowerBook was the first to feature a PCI architecture, EDO memory, and a 64-bit wide, 40 MHz internal bus. It was also the first PowerBook to feature a PC card slot capable of being used as a zoomed video port. Like all Apple laptops since the PowerBook 500 series, it featured a built-in trackpad as the pointing device.

== Specifications ==
The PowerBook 3400c series was issued in three different models, distinguished primarily by their processor speed. The base model ran at 180 MHz, and the two higher end models ran at 200 MHz and 240 MHz. Thus, the different models were referred to as the 3400c/180, 3400c/200, and 3400c/240. The 3400c/180 model was usually sold with only a built-in modem and a floppy drive; all 3400c/200 and 3400c/240 machines came with a built-in modem/Ethernet combination port and hot-swappable 1.4 MB floppy disk and CD drives. The only other difference between them was the capacity of the hard drive, ranging from 1.3 to 3.0 GB depending on the model.

== Names ==
Prior to the PowerBook 3400c series, the names of PowerBooks reflected (among other things) the type of screen they had installed. For example, the PowerBook 1400cs had a passive matrix screen, and the 1400c an active matrix screen. Because all PowerBook 3400c computers came with the same 16-bit color, active matrix screen, the "c" designation at the end of the PowerBook 3400c name was somewhat superfluous, and is often dropped, even by Apple itself, for example in the user's manual. The internal code name used for the PowerBook 3400c during development was "Hooper", named so after the dog of one of the product design engineers.

== Industrial design ==
In terms of industrial design, the PowerBook 3400c owed much to the earlier PowerBook 5300 series. There were some key changes made, however, including the larger LCD screen; a wider removable drive bay allowing the use of CD readers; and a curved display housing that allowed for the inclusion of a second set of loudspeakers.

The first generation of G3 PowerBooks retained the same external appearance as the PowerBook 3400c.

== CardBus compatibility ==
Like the PowerBook 5300 series, the 3400s came with a pair of PC card slots, but whereas those on the 5300s were strictly 16-bit device compatible, those on the 3400s were, at least in theory, compatible with 32-bit CardBus cards being based around the 32-bit Texas Instruments PCI1130 PC card controller. In reality, the PC card slots were designed to physically accept only 16-bit cards, though many users have managed to get a variety of CardBus cards to work with them. Using CardBus cards allows 3400 Series PowerBooks to be used with, for example, USB devices like printers and FireWire devices such as iPods.

== Technical specifications ==
According to Apple, all of these models are obsolete. (Note: Apple products that have been discontinued for 7 years and no longer receive hardware support or spare parts)

Model	3400c/180	3400c/200	3400c/240
Processor	PowerPC 603ev		
Clock speed	180 MHz	200 MHz	240 MHz
Cache	16 KB data L1, 16 KB instruction L1, 256 KB L2		
System bus	40 MHz		
Memory	16 MB, expandable to 144 MB		
Display	12.1-inch, 800 × 600, active-matrix, 15-bit color		
Graphics controller	Chips and Technologies 65550		
Graphics memory	2 MB		
Hard Drive	1.3 GB	2 GB	3 GB
Removable media (Hot swappable)	1.44 MB SuperDrive floppy		
Removable media (Hot swappable)	Optional 6× CD-ROM	6× CD-ROM	12× CD-ROM
Connectivity	Optional 10BASE-T Ethernet	10BASE-T Ethernet	
Connectivity	Optional 33.6k Modem	33.6k Modem	
Peripherals	1 × ADB, 1 × serial, 1 × SCSI (HDI-30)		
Video Out	HDI-15		
Supported OS	Mac OS 7.6.1 – Mac OS 9.1		
Dimensions	2.4 × 11.5 × 9.5 in (61 × 292 × 241 mm)		
Weight	7.2 lb (3.3 kg)		

== Timeline ==
Timeline of portable Macintoshes
See also: List of Mac models
