= PowerBook 1400 =

Laptop by Apple

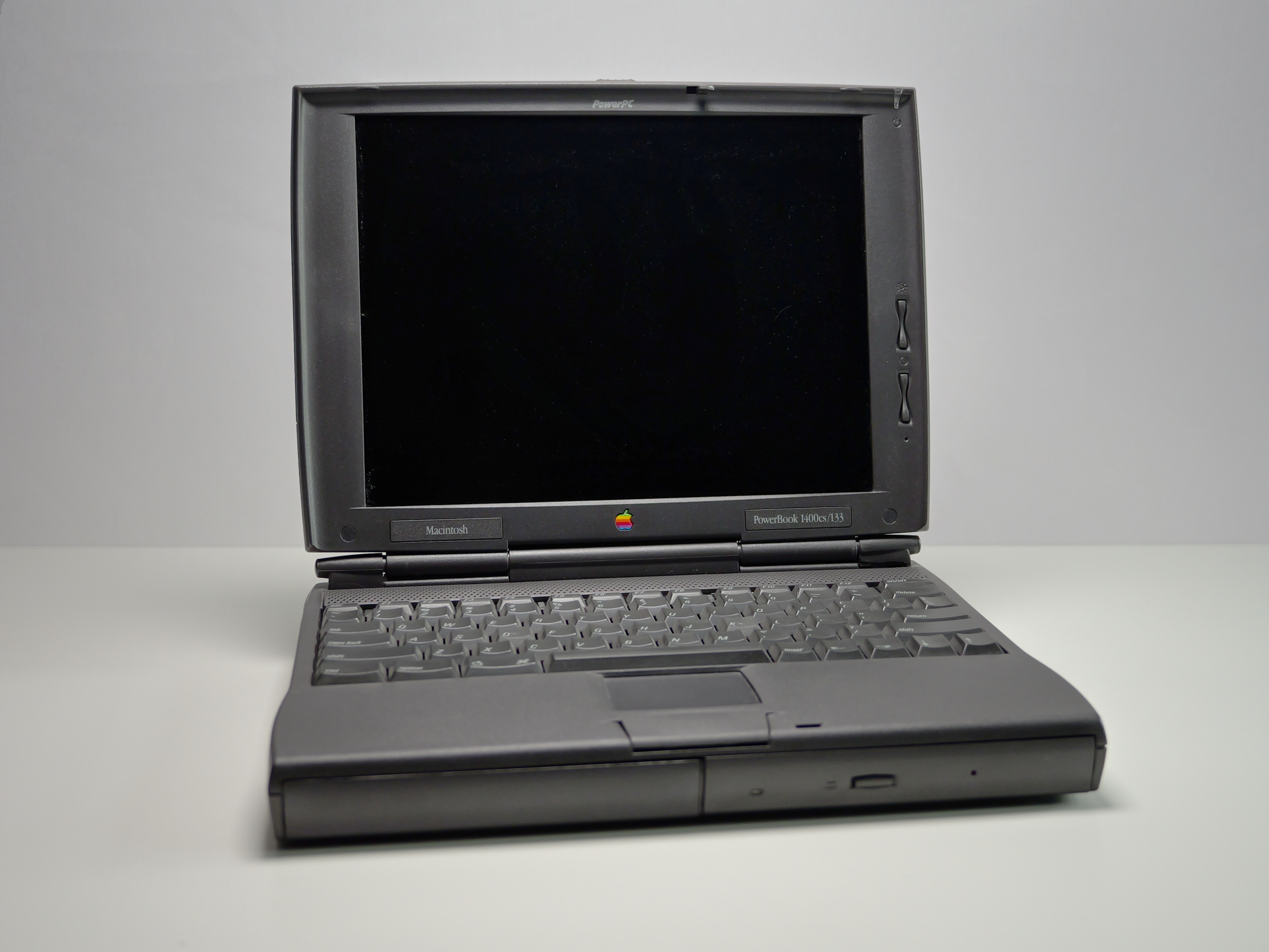
- PowerBook 1400cs/133
- Developer: Apple Computer
- Manufacturer: Quanta Computer
- Type: Laptop
- Released: November 20, 1996
- Introductory price: US$2,499 (equivalent to $5,100 in 2025)
- Discontinued: May 1998
- Operating system: System 7.5.3 – Mac OS 9.1
- CPU: PowerPC 603e @ 117, 133 or 166 MHz
- Memory: 12 or 16 MB, expandable to 64 MB
- Display: 11.3"
- Predecessor: PowerBook 190; PowerBook 5300
- Successor: PowerBook G3
- Related: PowerBook 2400c PowerBook 3400c

The PowerBook 1400 is a laptop computer designed and manufactured by Quanta Computer for Apple Computer and sold from October 1996 to May 1998. By working with Quanta, Apple was able to bring the 1400 to market on a shorter development schedule to replace the troubled PowerBook 5300 in Apple's PowerBook line. After the high-end PowerBook 3400 was introduced in February 1997, the 1400 was repositioned as an entry-level laptop and was sold alongside the subcompact PowerBook 2400.

== Design ==
Following the troubled launch of the PowerBook 5300 in August 1995, Apple sought to bring a new PowerBook to market on a shorter development schedule. Phil Baker, Apple's director of entry-level laptops, contracted Quanta Computer, an original design manufacturer, to modify one of its pre-existing notebook designs to become the 1400. Minimal changes were made to the exterior to align it with Apple's design language, while Quanta adapted the 5300's architecture for the new computer.

The design gave the PowerBook 1400 an expansion bay large enough for a CD-ROM drive, a first for a PowerBook. The bay also accepted a floppy drive or Zip drive. The drives could be "warm swapped" while the computer was in sleep mode.

However the reuse of the architecture of the 5300 meant that it retained constraints of the earlier design, including the 117 MHz PowerPC 603e processor without an L2 cache and a 64 MB memory limit.

The PowerBook 1400 used removable "BookCover" panels, a feature Apple marketed to home users and students. Each computer included a gray panel matching the computer's case and a clear panel. Users could create custom inserts with a bundled template and place them beneath the clear panel.

The PowerBook 1400 had two PC Card slots, infrared communications, and an internal expansion slot for video-out or Ethernet cards.

== Models and specifications ==
Apple initially offered the PowerBook 1400 with a 117 MHz PowerPC 603e processor. It added a 133 MHz model in May 1997 and a 166 MHz model in July 1997. While the 117 MHz model lacked an L2 cache; the 133 MHz and 166 MHz models included a 128 KB L2 cache.

Each version was available as a 1400c, with an active matrix LCD, or a 1400cs, with a passive-matrix dual-scan LCD. Both used 11.3-inch (290 mm) color displays with an 800 × 600 resolution.

The initial 1400cs configuration included a 750 MB hard drive and 12 MB of RAM, without a CD-ROM drive, at a price of US$2,499 (equivalent to $5,100 in 2025). An additional 4 MB of RAM soldered to the motherboard and a CD-ROM drive could be added to the 1400cs for US$400 (equivalent to $820 in 2025). The 1400c included a 1 GB hard drive, 16 MB of RAM, and a CD-ROM drive, and sold for US$3,499 (equivalent to $7,200 in 2025).

== Reception ==
In a contemporary review, Macworld noted the PowerBook 1400's expansion-bay CD-ROM drive, display, keyboard, and trackpad, while criticizing the 117 MHz model's lack of an L2 cache.

MacUser described the 1400 as a reliable basic portable. The review praised its price, configuration range, display, CD-ROM drive, and BookCover panels, while finding its performance unremarkable.

== Technical specifications ==
According to Apple, all of these models are obsolete. (Note: Apple products that have been discontinued for 7 years and no longer receive hardware support or spare parts)

		1400cs/117	1400c/117	1400cs/133	1400c/133	1400cs/166	1400c/166
Introduced		October 1, 1996		May 19, 1997	October 1, 1996	October 15, 1997	July 14, 1997
Discontinued		July 14, 1997		May 1998			
Display	Size	11.3-inch (29 cm)					
Display	Method	Dual-scan passive	Active	Dual-scan passive	Active	Dual-scan passive	Active
Display	Colors	15-bit (thousands)					
Display	Resolution	800 × 600					
Storage	Hard drive	750 MB, 1 GB or 2 GB EIDE					
Storage	Floppy	Removable 1.44 MB SuperDrive					
Storage	CD-ROM	Removable 6×, 8× or 12×					
Performance	CPU	PowerPC 603e					
Performance	CPU speed	117 MHz		133 MHz		166 MHz	
Performance	RAM	12 or 16 MB on board, expandable to 64 MB	16 MB on board, expandable to 64 MB				
Performance	ROM	4 MB					
Performance	Graphics controller	Chips and Technologies 65525A					
Networking		None (default); Modem & Ethernet available as upgrades					
Battery		1.5–4.0 hours					
Dimensions	H × W × D	11.5 in × 9.0 in × 2.1 in (292 mm × 229 mm × 54 mm)					
Dimensions	Weight	6.7 lb (3.0 kg)	6.6 lb (3.0 kg)	6.7 lb (3.0 kg)	6.6 lb (3.0 kg)	6.7 lb (3.0 kg)	6.6 lb (3.0 kg)
Port connections		1 × ADB, 1 × serial, 1 × SCSI (HDI-30), 1 × 3.5 mm audio in, 1 × 3.5 mm audio out					
Expansion slots		2 PC Card slots, 1 RAM slot (piggyback)					
Audio		8-bit stereo					
Gestalt ID		310					
Code name		Epic					
Refs							

== Timeline ==
Timeline of portable Macintoshes
See also: List of Mac models
