= PC Exchange =

PC Exchange, sometimes called File Exchange, was a utility program for Macintosh computers that allowed classic Mac OS to read floppy disks and other storage media with FAT formatting.

== History ==
PC Exchange was made around 1992 and was shipped with System 7. It originally cost around $79, but was later made free. It was not carried over to OS X, as it has native support for reading and writing FAT-formatted files.

== Functions ==
PC Exchange was a control panel that matched a file extension to a corresponding Mac program that was defined in the control panel. It required the Macintosh have a 1.4MB SuperDrive. The type of application that opened specific files could be changed in the control panel. It originally only supported floppy disks, but support was added for other storage types such as CD-ROM and removable hard drives. Floppy disks could also be formatted for MS-DOS.
