= PowerBook 2400c =

Laptop by Apple

Macintosh PowerBook 2400c
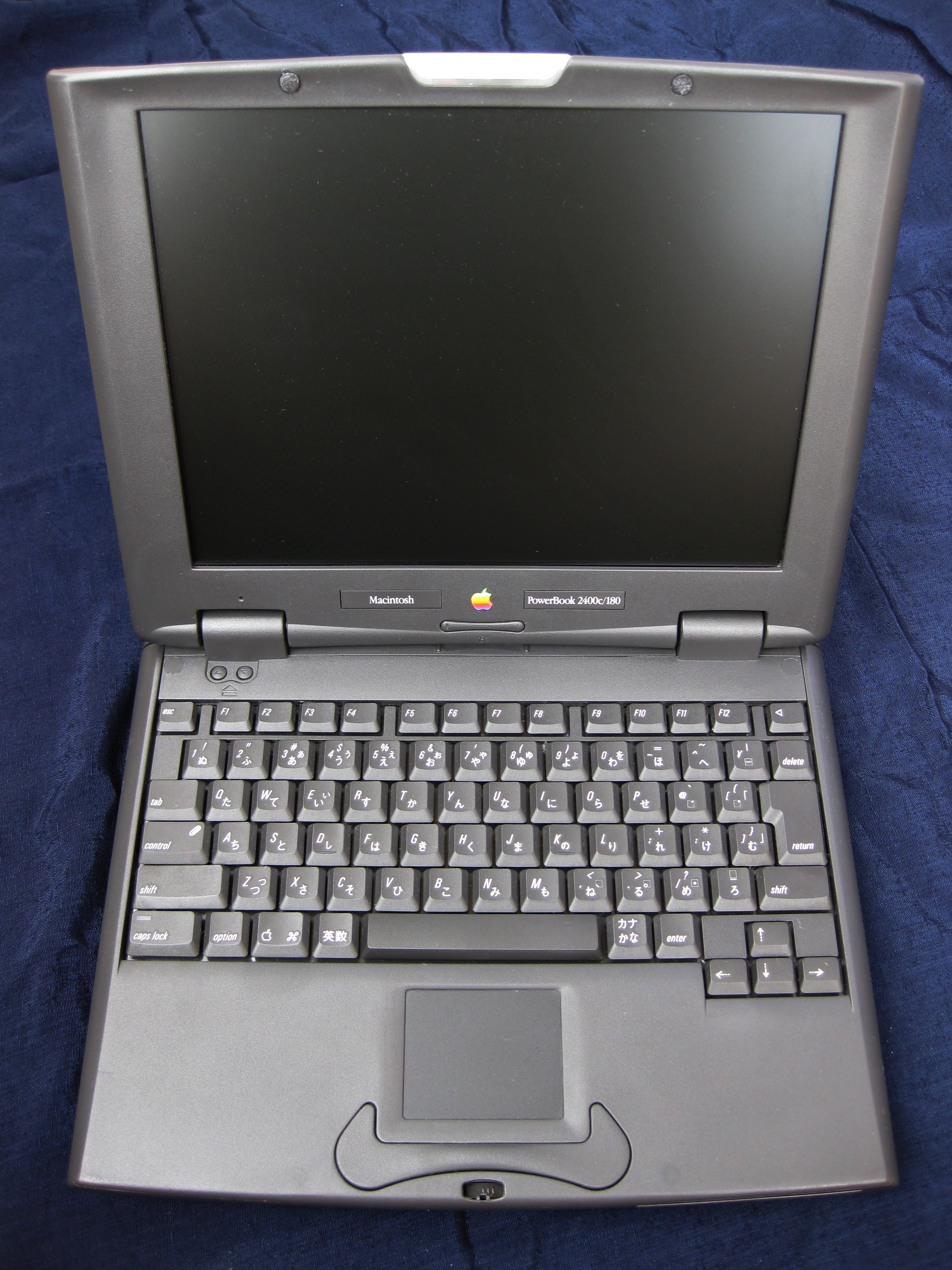
- Macintosh PowerBook 2400c/180, Japanese version
- Codename: Comet, Nautilus, 2400c/240: Mighty Cat
- Developer: Apple Computer
- Manufacturer: IBM Japan
- Product family: PowerBook
- Released: May 8, 1997; 29 years ago
- Introductory price: US$5,700 (equivalent to $11,400 in 2025)
- Discontinued: March 14, 1998
- Operating system: Mac OS 7.6.1 – 9.1
- CPU: PowerPC 603ev @ 180 or 240 (Note: Only offered in Japan) MHz
- Memory: 16 MB, expandable to 112 MB (60 ns SO-DIMM)
- Storage: 1.3 GB (EIDE)
- Display: 10.4-in color dual-scan or active matrix, 800 × 600, 16-bit
- Graphics: Chips and Technologies CT6550
- Dimensions: 1.9 × 10.5 × 8.5 in (48 × 267 × 216 mm)
- Weight: 4.4 lb (2.0 kg)
- Predecessor: PowerBook Duo 2300c
- Successor: PowerBook G3
- Related: PowerBook 1400; PowerBook 3400c
- Made in: Japan

The PowerBook 2400c is a compact laptop computer manufactured by IBM Japan for Apple Computer and sold from 1997 to 1998. It was positioned as a premium subnotebook, replacing the PowerBook Duo 2300c, which had been the last of the subnotebook PowerBook Duo series. The PowerBook 2400c was sold alongside the entry-level PowerBook 1400 and the high-end PowerBook 3400. The 2400c was discontinued across most of the world in March 1998, with no immediate replacement; the model that followed it was the larger PowerBook G3. In Japan, where there was greater demand for subnotebooks, a 2400c with a 240 MHz CPU (codenamed "Mighty Cat") was offered until the end of 1998.

== Overview ==
The 2400c uses the same PowerPC 603e processor as the preceding Duo 2300c, but at 180 MHz rather than 100 MHz. However, unlike its predecessor, the 2400c cannot utilize the Duo Dock, leaving it without that option to compensate for the absence of an internal removable drive. Like the PowerBook 100 and Duo series before it, it was sold with an external floppy drive. Apple did not offer a CD-ROM drive for it, which was otherwise standard for all other PowerBooks at the time.

Unlike the Duo, the peripheral ports on the 2400c more closely matched those of the original PowerBook 100 series. These included ADB, a serial port, a floppy port (unique to the 2400c rather than the HDI-20 standard), and an HDI-30 SCSI port. The 2400c also added VGA video output, stereo sound input and output ports, an infrared port, and two PCMCIA card slots. The PCMCIA slots on the original 180 MHz model officially accept only two Type II or one Type III card; however, some users applied motherboard modifications to enable CardBus expansion cards. The Japanese 240 MHz model supported CardBus as standard.

The 2400c is built around a 10.4-inch (26 cm) dual-scan or active matrix color LCD screen. It is slightly smaller and lighter, though a bit thicker, than a 12-inch (30 cm) iBook, and smaller than the 12-inch (30 cm) PowerBook G4 introduced several years later.

Due to its processor being located on a detachable daughter card, the PowerBook 2400c accommodated a small number of PowerPC G3 processor upgrade cards. Interware and Newer Technologies offered upgrades replacing the 603e with a G3 processor ranging from 240 MHz to 400 MHz.

== Timeline ==
Timeline of portable Macintoshes
See also: List of Mac models
