= PowerBook 5300 =

PowerBook laptop model

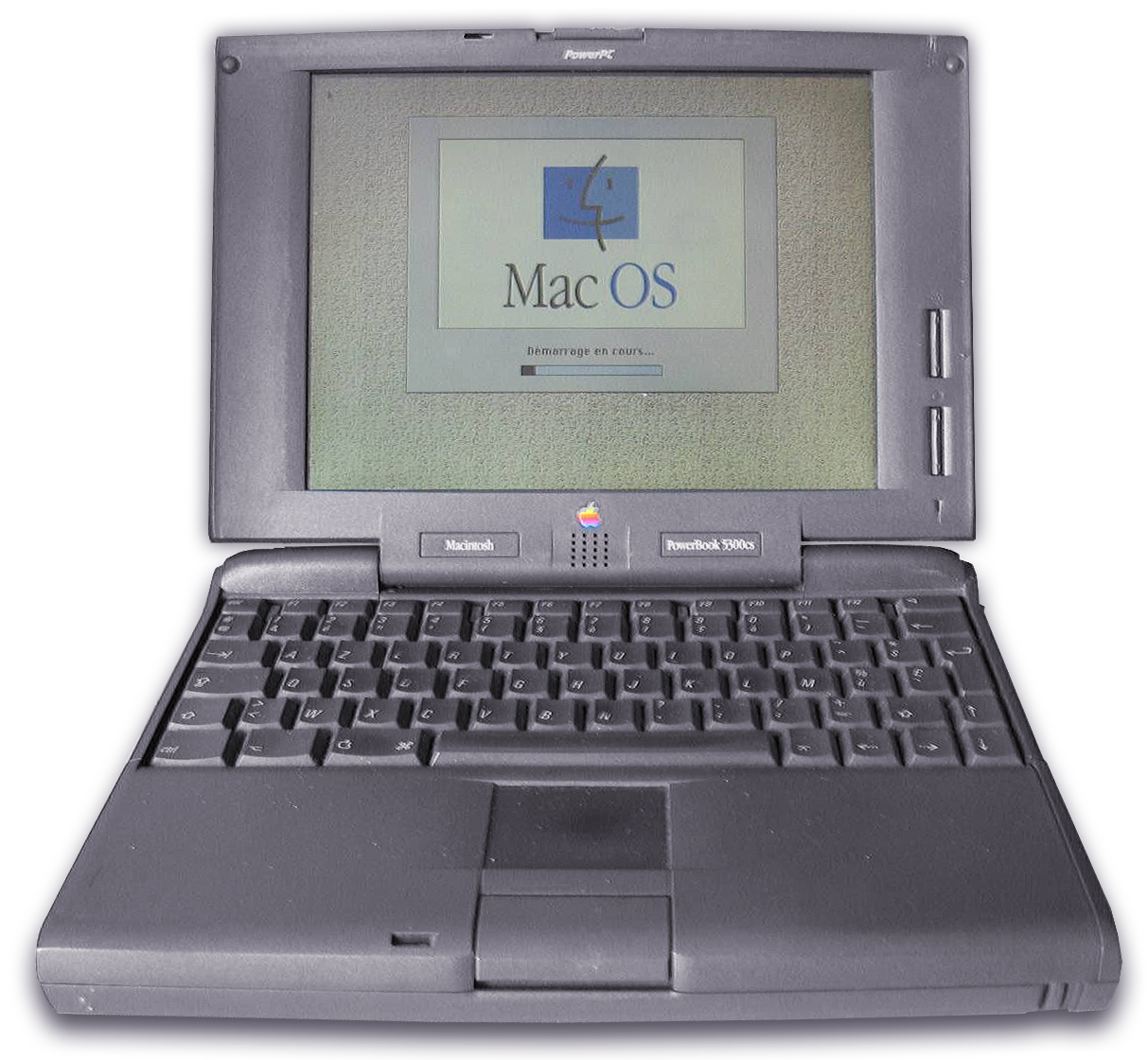
- PowerBook 5300cs
- Product family: PowerBook
- Released: August 25, 1995
- Introductory price: 5300: US$2,199 (equivalent to $4,600 in 2025); 5300cs: US$2,799 (equivalent to $5,900 in 2025); 5300c: US$3,699 (equivalent to $7,800 in 2025); 5300ce: US$6,499 (equivalent to $13,700 in 2025)
- Discontinued: August 3, 1996
- Operating system: System 7.5.2 – Mac OS 9.1
- CPU: PowerPC 603e; 5300 / 5300cs / 5300c: 100 MHz; 5300ce: 117 MHz
- Memory: PowerPC 603e; 5300 / 5300cs / 5300c: 8 MB; 5300ce: 32 MB; expandable to 64 MB
- Predecessor: PowerBook 500 series
- Successor: PowerBook 1400; PowerBook 3400
- Related: PowerBook 190; PowerBook Duo 2300c

The PowerBook 5300 is a series of PowerBook laptop computers manufactured by Apple Computer and released in August 1995. Before launch, it was highly anticipated as the first laptop to use the PowerPC processor. The series also introduced features including hot-swappable expansion modules, PC Card slots, and an infrared communication port. It was positioned as the company's high-end laptop, above the entry-level PowerBook 190 and the subcompact PowerBook Duo 2300.

The computers retained several ports used on earlier Macintosh portable models, including SCSI, serial, and ADB ports. An internal expansion slot supported modules such as Ethernet adapters and video cards for connecting a second display in mirrored or dual-screen configurations. A hot-swappable drive bay supported removable modules, although its size limited compatibility with some devices, including internal CD-ROM drives.

The 5300 experienced several design and manufacturing problems after release, including structural weaknesses and reliability concerns reported by reviewers and users. Additionally, some early units were recalled after reports of overheating and fire hazards involving their lithium-ion battery packs.

Following the troubled release of the 5300, Apple introduced the PowerBook 1400 in November 1996 after a compressed development schedule enabled by reusing the 5300's architecture in a case designed and manufactured under contract by Quanta Computer. The PowerBook 5300 was discontinued in August 1996 after less than a year on sale. The high-end PowerBook 3400 was released in February 1997 with a full-sized CD-ROM drive bay and higher performance compared with the 5300.

== Design ==
The PowerBook 5300 was designed during 1993 and 1994 under the codename M2. Compared with the preceding PowerBook 500 series, the 5300 was explicitly designed to be as small as possible (which precluded the use of a CD-ROM drive) and featured a more compact but less curvy design. Pop-out feet were used instead of the rotating rocker-style feet typical of earlier PowerBooks, and a slightly darker shade of grey was used for the plastic casing. The PowerBook 190 and 190cs used an identical casing and shared many features and internal components, but used the older and slower Motorola 68LC040 processor instead, which could be upgraded to a full PPC processor by swapping the logic board.

== Specifications ==
There are four models in the 5300 series, ranging from the base greyscale 5300 to the higher-resolution, TFT-equipped 5300ce:

Model	Display	CPU clock	RAM	MSRP
5300	9.5 in (240 mm) passive matrix greyscale, 640 × 480	100 MHz	8 MB	$2,199
5300cs	10.4 in (260 mm) passive matrix color, 640 × 480	100 MHz	8 MB	$2,799
5300c	10.4 in (260 mm) active matrix color, 640 × 480	100 MHz	8 MB	$3,699
5300ce	10.4 in (260 mm) active matrix color, 600 × 800	117 MHz	32 MB	$6,499

== Recalls ==
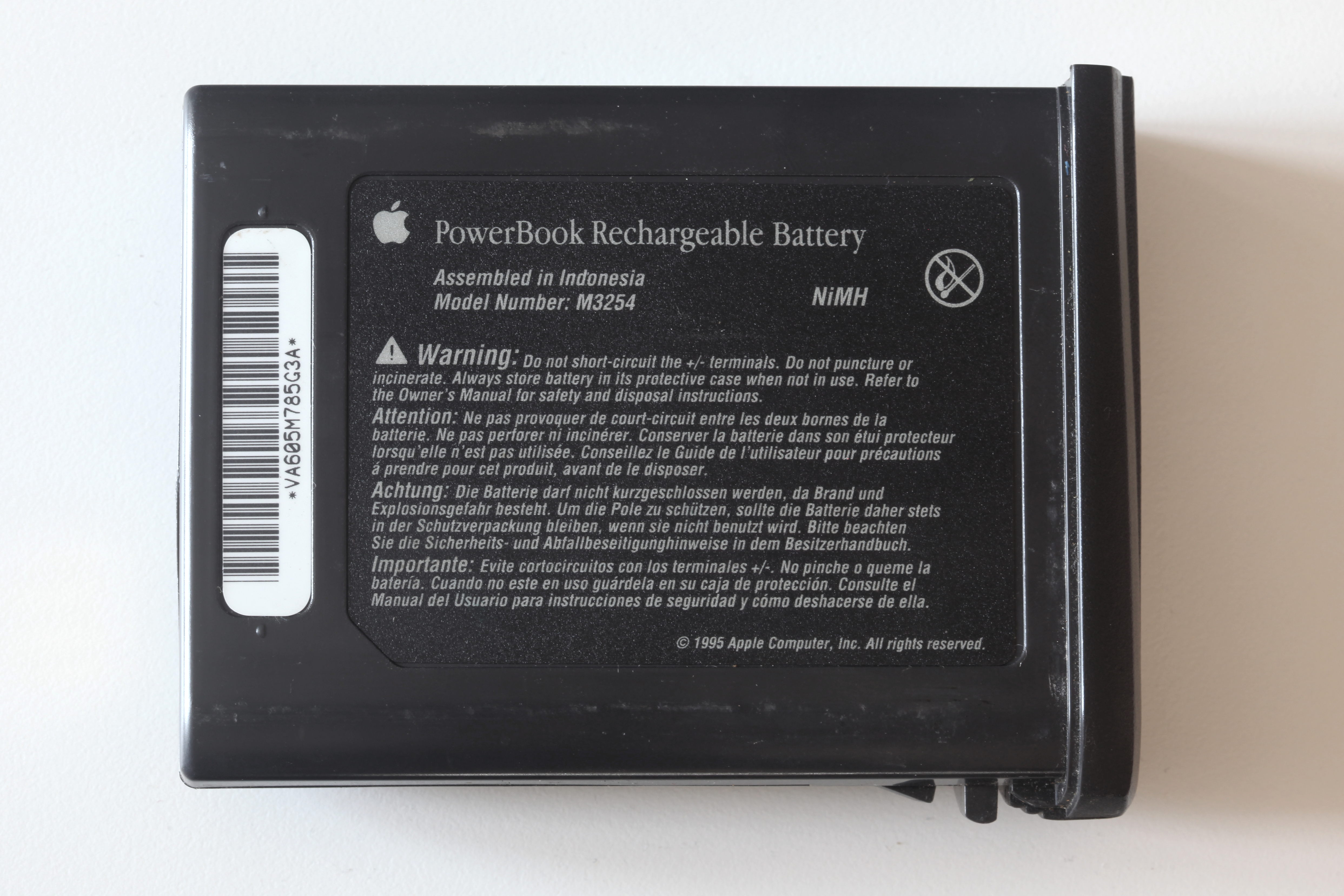
NiMH battery pack

The PowerBook 5300 series was subject to product recalls due to reports of cracked cases and other hardware problems. Some systems developed failures of internal ribbon cables, which could cause vertical lines on the display or complete display failure. Similar hinge and cable issues had affected earlier PowerBook 500 series models.

Two early production PowerBook 5300 units caught fire after their Sony-manufactured lithium-ion batteries overheated during charging. Apple recalled approximately 100 computers and replaced the lithium-ion batteries in affected and subsequent units with nickel–metal hydride (NiMH) batteries, which provided less battery endurance.

Contemporary media commentators cited the technical problems as a reflection of broader operational difficulties at Apple during that period.

== Reception ==
Reviewers criticized the computer's performance, especially relative to its cost.

=== Lack of level 2 cache ===
Although the PowerPC 603e processor used in the PowerBook 5300 series operated at higher clock speeds than earlier PowerBook processors, the computers lacked a level 2 cache. This reduced performance in some applications compared with systems using the same processor with cache memory.

=== Expansion bay options ===
The PowerBook 5300 series supported several expansion bay modules, but its compact design limited the available options. A full-sized CD-ROM drive could not fit within the existing bay design. Apple developed a prototype CD-ROM module designed for smaller 80 mm discs, but it was not released. The company initially planned to offer 3.5-inch magneto-optical drive modules, with a later revision of the computer potentially accommodating a full-sized CD-ROM drive.

== Legacy ==
Apple's next high-end series of portables, the PowerBook 3400 series introduced in February 1997, shared an almost identical form factor with the 5300, right down to being able to share many of the same expansion modules. However, the 3400 series were substantially different on the inside, featuring DMA and PCI architecture. The first series of PowerBook G3 portables released in November 1997 were internally even more advanced, being built around the PowerPC G3 processor, though they still retained the basic PowerBook 5300 form factor. Apple did not introduce portables with an entirely new form factor until March 1998 with the release of the "Wallstreet" G3 PowerBook.

== Popular use in media ==
The 5300 is seen in several movies during the 1990s, including Liar Liar (1997), Free Willy 3: The Rescue (1997), Home Alone 3 (1997), The Saint (1997), Volcano (1997), My Best Friend's Wedding (1997), Jingle All the Way (1996), Ransom (1996), Fled (1996) and Independence Day (1996).

== Gallery ==
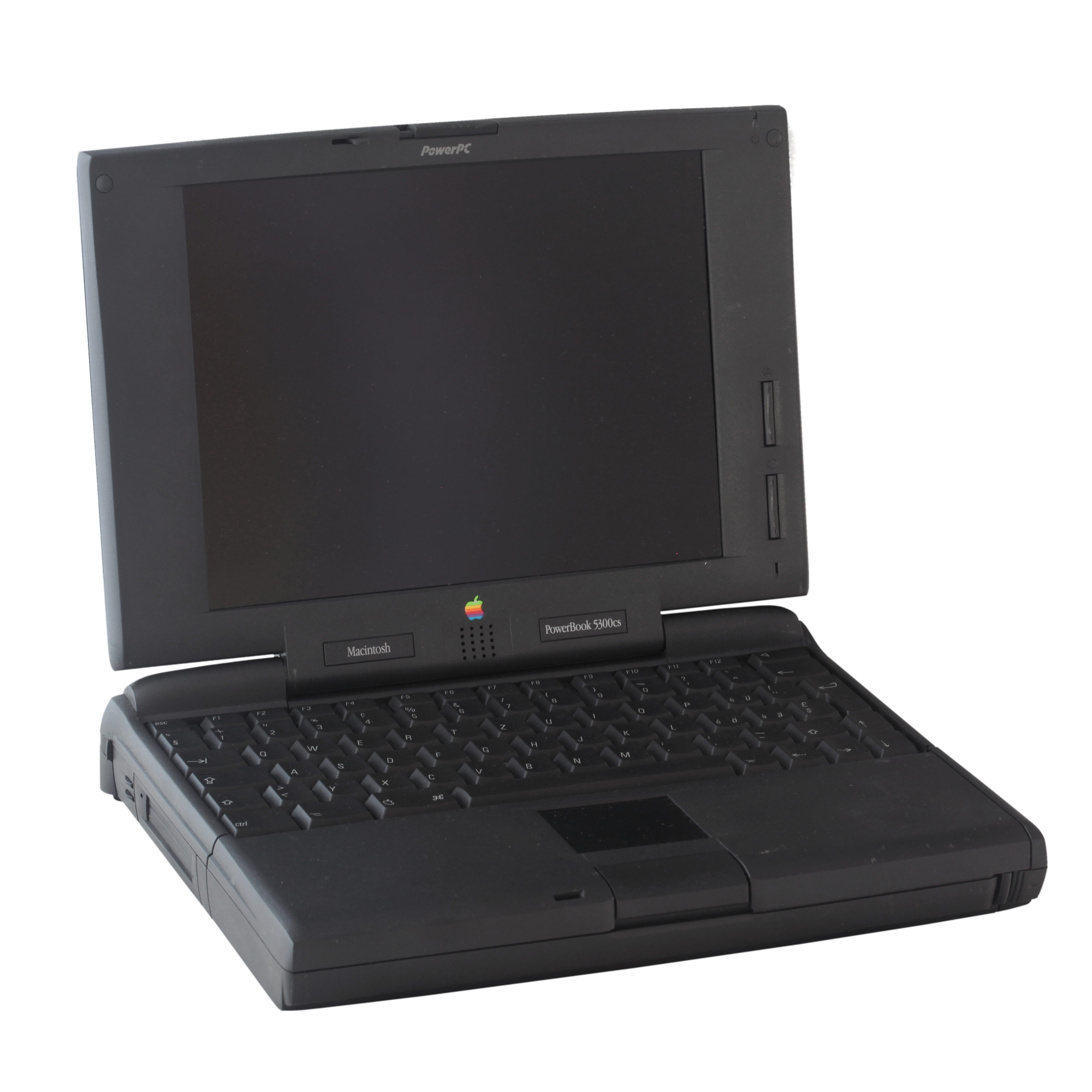
PC Card bay on the left side

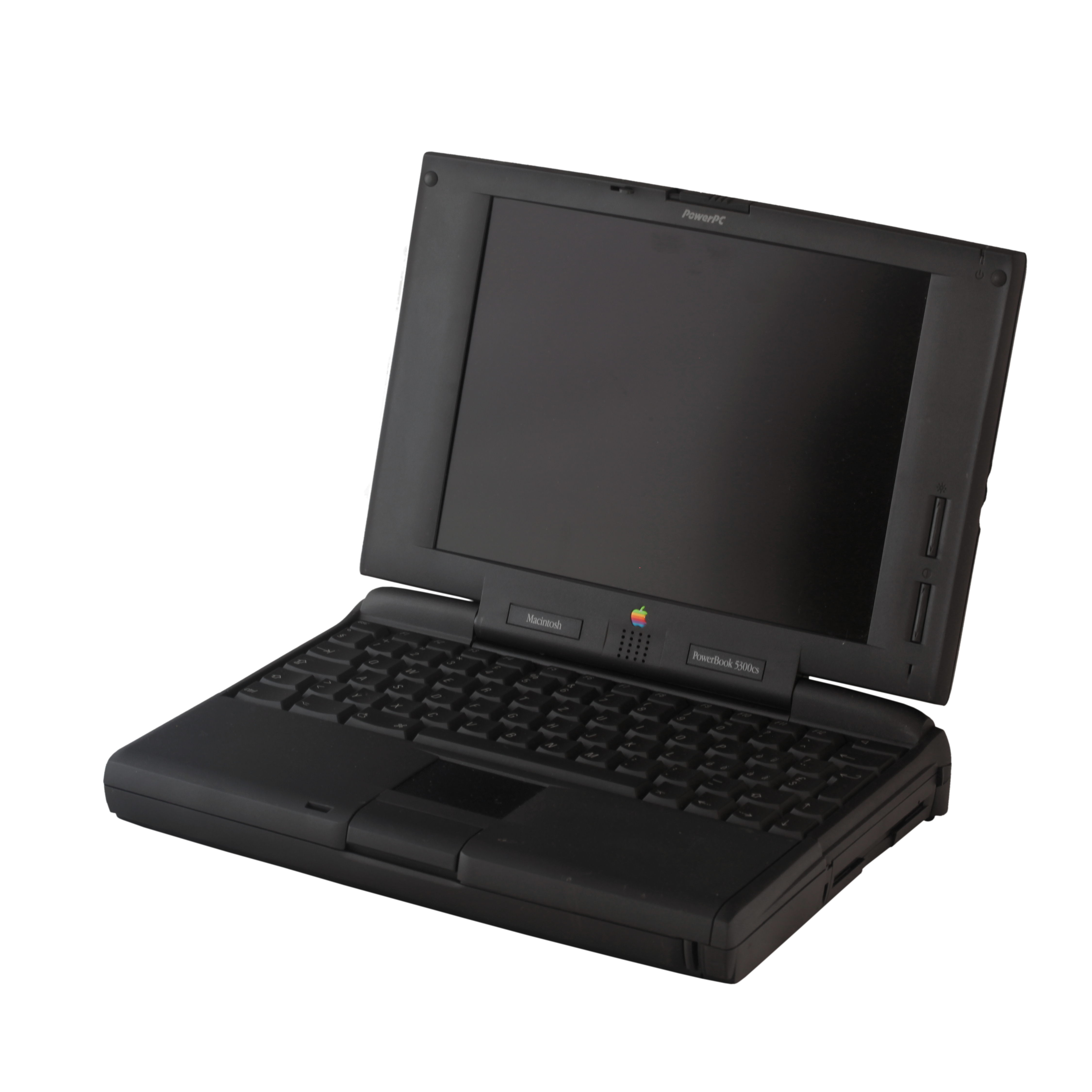
Floppy drive on the right side

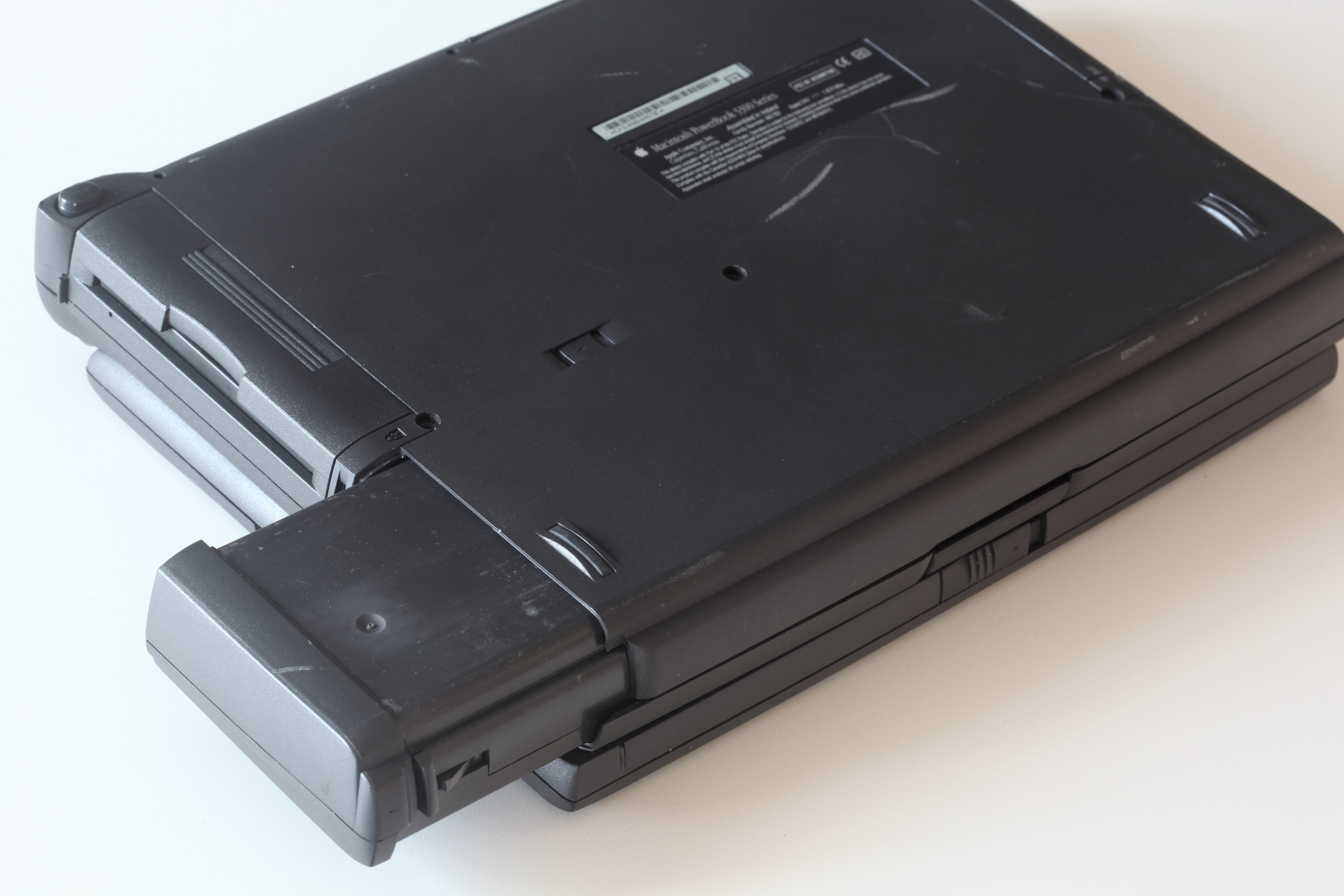
Battery (partly removed) on the right side

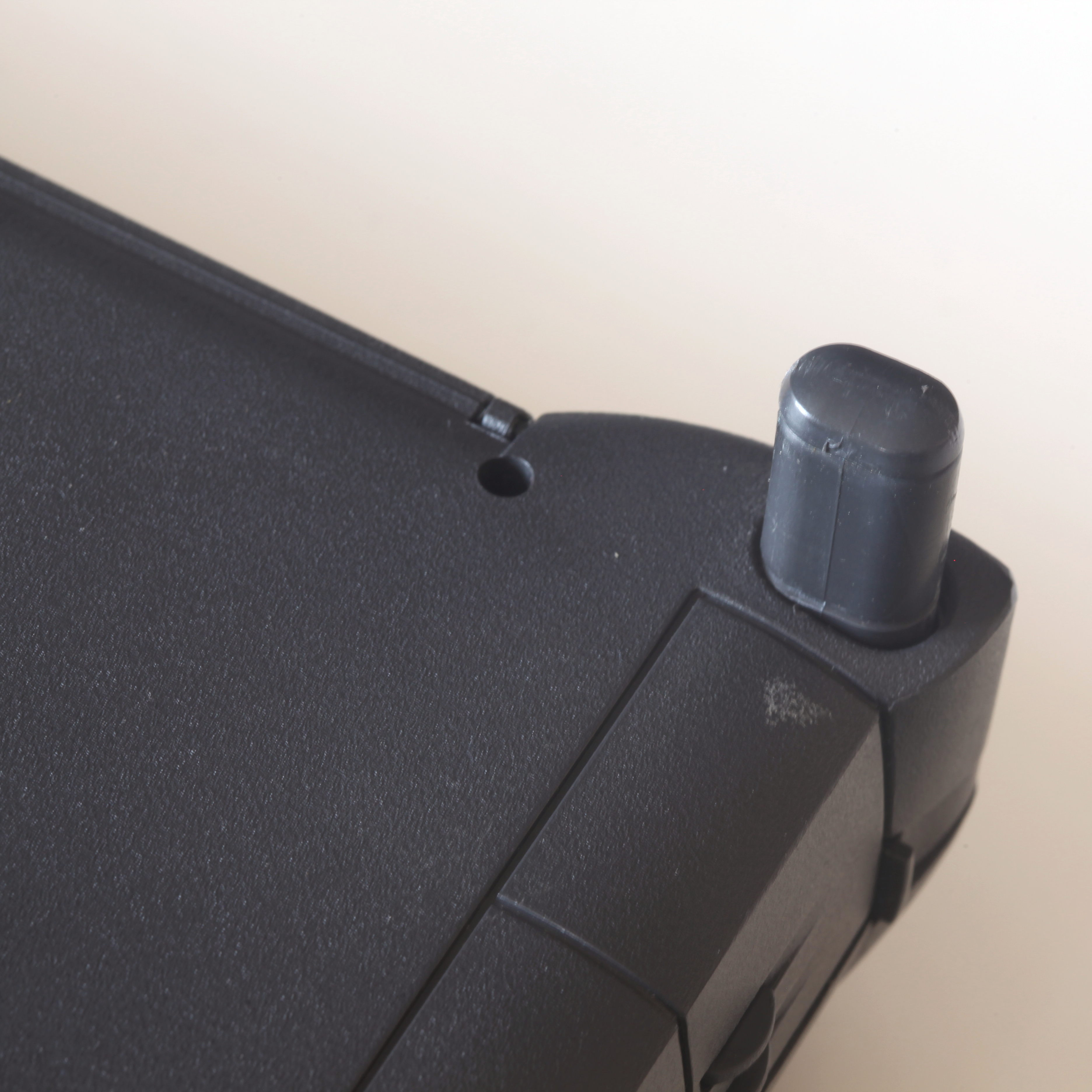
Pop-out feet

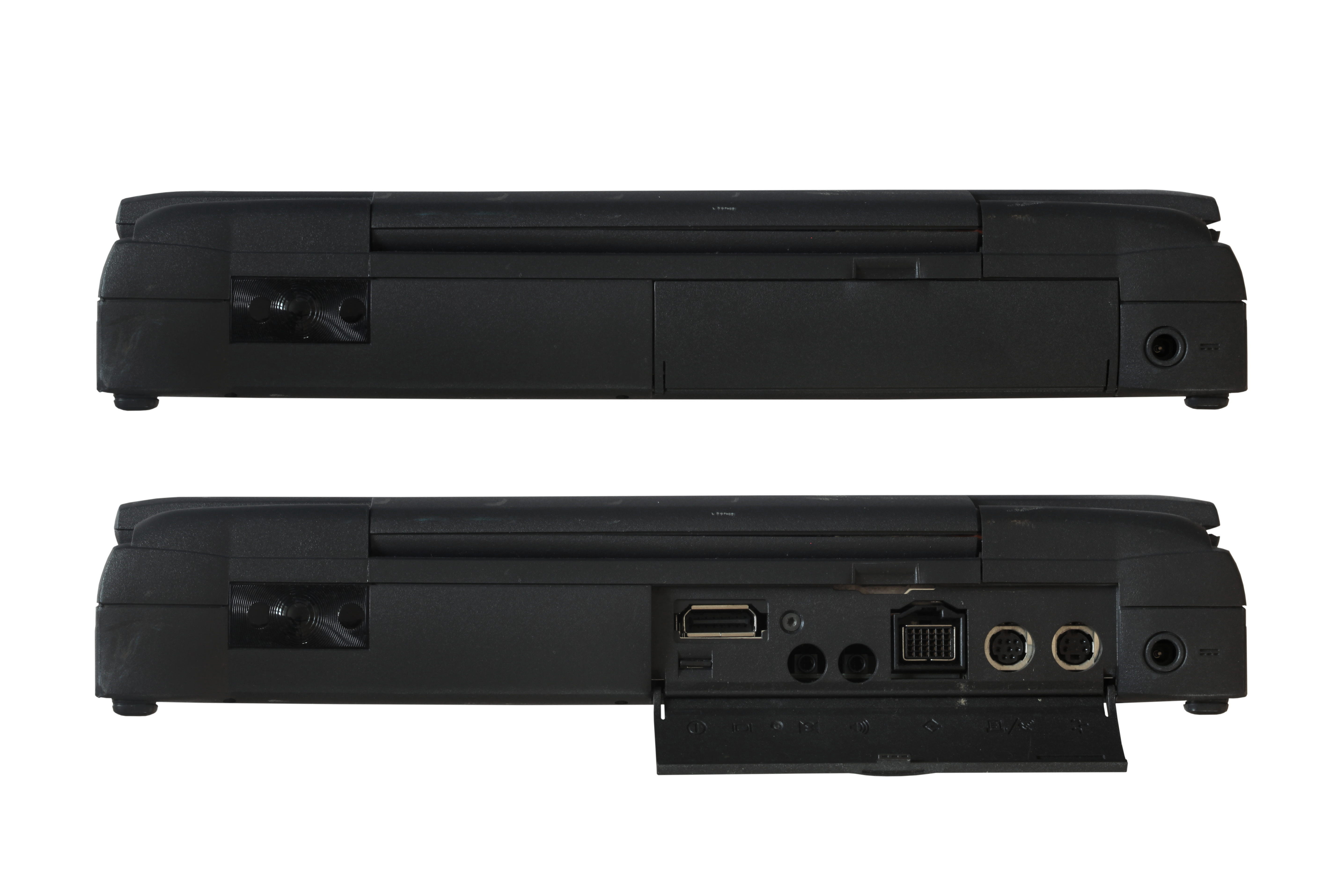
Connectors behind back panel and IR sensor

== Timeline ==
Timeline of portable Macintoshes
See also: List of Mac models
