= Global Village Communication =

American telecommunications manufacturer

Global Village Communication Inc.
- Company type: Public
- Industry: Telecommunications
- Founded: June 1989; 36 years ago in Mountain View, California, United States
- Defunct: 2000; 25 years ago
- Fate: Acquired by Boca Research in 1998; Global Village division sold to Zoom Telephonics in 2000 and dissolved
- Products: Modems
- Number of employees: 65 (1992)

Global Village Communication Inc. was a leading manufacturer of easy-to-use fax modems and other telecommunications products for Apple's Macintosh platform. It was one of the few manufacturers to support the Mac's RS-422 serial ports without requiring an adapter. Major product lines included the TelePort series of high-speed desktop dial-up modems, and the PowerPort series of internal PowerBook modems, as well as a series of modems that connected to the Mac's ADB port. Many of its products were bundled with the Macintosh Performa series of computers, and it was the manufacturer for the internal modem in the PowerBook 500 series.

The company also produced the OneWorld fax server and the GlobalFax fax software for Macintosh computers, which it bundled with its hardware.

Amid a sharp decline in Macintosh sales in the late 1990s, Global Village sold itself to Boca Research in June 1998. Boca Research in turn sold the Global Village division to Zoom Telephonics in 2000.
