= Think Global =

Defunct electrical car company

TH!NK Global
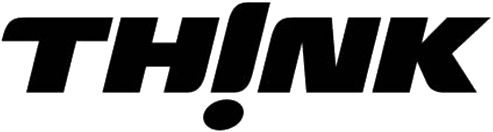
- Formerly: Personal Independent Vehicle Company (1991–2006)
- Type: Private (1991–99); Subsidiary (1999–2011)
- Industry: Automotive
- Founded: December 1991
- Defunct: June 22, 2011; 15 years ago
- Fate: Declared bankruptcy
- Headquarters: Bærum, Norway
- Products: Electric cars
- Brands: Think City
- Number of employees: 125+
- Parent: Ford (1999–2003); KamKorp (2003–2006); InSpire (2006–2011)

Think Global was a Norwegian electric car manufacturer located in Bærum, which manufactured cars under the TH!NK brand. Production of the Think City was stopped in March 2011 and the company filed for bankruptcy on June 22, 2011, for the fourth time in 20 years. The company was bought soon after by Electric Mobility Solutions AS and production ceased in August 2012 with no more announcements regarding future production. As of October 2010, a total of 2,500 units had been manufactured at Oslo-based TH!NK's production facility.

The Ford TH!NK was a line of electric vehicles produced by TH!NK Mobility, then an enterprise of the Ford Motor Company. The short-lived line included four models: the TH!NK Neighbor and the TH!NK City, small electric automobiles, and the TH!NK Bike Traveler and the TH!NK Bike Fun, electric-powered motorized bicycle. Ford sold its stock, and the resulting company, Think Global, produced electric cars in Norway until declaring bankruptcy in 2011.

== History ==
The company was founded in January 1991 in Bærum, as "Pivco" (for Personal Independent Vehicle Company). The first practical prototype, the PIV2, like the vehicles that followed, were built around a chassis made of aluminum and carrying a body made of polyethylene thermoplastic rotomolded in one piece. The chassis were developed by Hydro Aluminium Tonder in Tønder in Denmark and were one of the main reasons that Ford later acquired 51% of the stock. 10 of 15 prototypes were built in time for the Lillehammer Olympic Winter Games in 1994. The battery technology was NiCd, driving a three-phase AC induction motor via the front wheels.

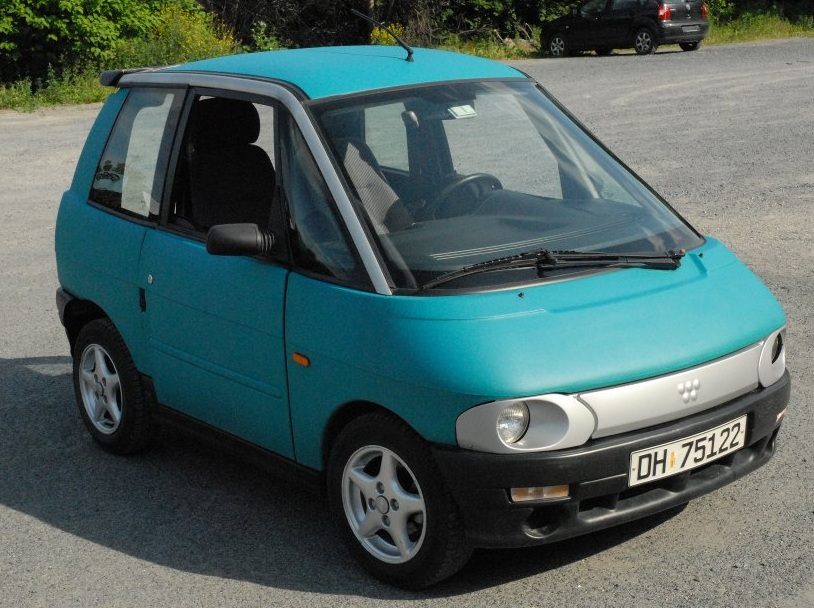
PIV3, the City Bee, launched in 1995

The PIV2 was followed by the PIV3, the City Bee (Citi in the US), introduced in 1995. 120 of these were produced, 40 of which participated in the San Francisco Bay Area Station Car Demonstration project from 1995 to 1998.

Based on the experiences from the prototypes, Pivco then went on to develop their first true production model, PIV4, later called the TH!NK, with Lotus Cars in a consulting role. The basic construction concept from the prototypes was retained, except that the roof was made of ABS plastic, and the lower frame chassis elements were made of steel. The production model had a range of 85 kilometres (53 mi) (modified ECE101 cycle) between charges, and a top speed of 90 km/h (56 mph).

Development took more time and resources than anticipated, so when development of the production model was finished in 1999, finances had dried up. The company was then acquired by Ford, who could start production of the TH!NK City. Ford even embraced the TH!NK concept, and marketed electrically driven bicycles as well as golf carts under the same brand.

The TH!NK city Electric Vehicle (EV) Demonstration Program Project was initiated late 2001, and completed in April 2005. US. Partners include Federal, State and Municipal agencies as well as commercial partners. Phase I, consisted of placement of the vehicles in demonstration programs, and it was completed in 2002. Phase II, the monitoring of these programs was completed in 2004. Phase III, the decommissioning and/or exporting of vehicles concluded in 2005. Phase I - the Program successfully assigned 192 EV's with customers (including Hertz) in the state of California, 109 in New York (including loaner and demo vehicles), 16 in Georgia, 7 to customers outside of the US and 52 in Ford's internal operations in Dearborn, Michigan for a total of 376 vehicles. Phase II – the monitoring of the operational fleet was ongoing and completed in 2004, and all vehicles were returned throughout 2004 and 2005. The Department of Energy (DOE) was involved with the monitoring of the New York Power Authority / TH!NK Clean Commute Program units through partnership with Electric Transportation Engineering Corporation (ETEC), which filed separate reports to DOE. The remainder of the field fleet was monitored through Ford's internal operations. Vehicles were retired from lease operation throughout the program for various operator reasons. Some of the vehicles were involved in re-leasing operations. At the end of the program, 376 vehicles had been involved, 372 of which were available for customer use while 4 were engineering prototype and study vehicles. At the end of leases, City vehicles have been decommissioned and/or exported to KamKorp in Norway. By April 2005, the last of the City vehicles had been returned and processed or exported to Norway.

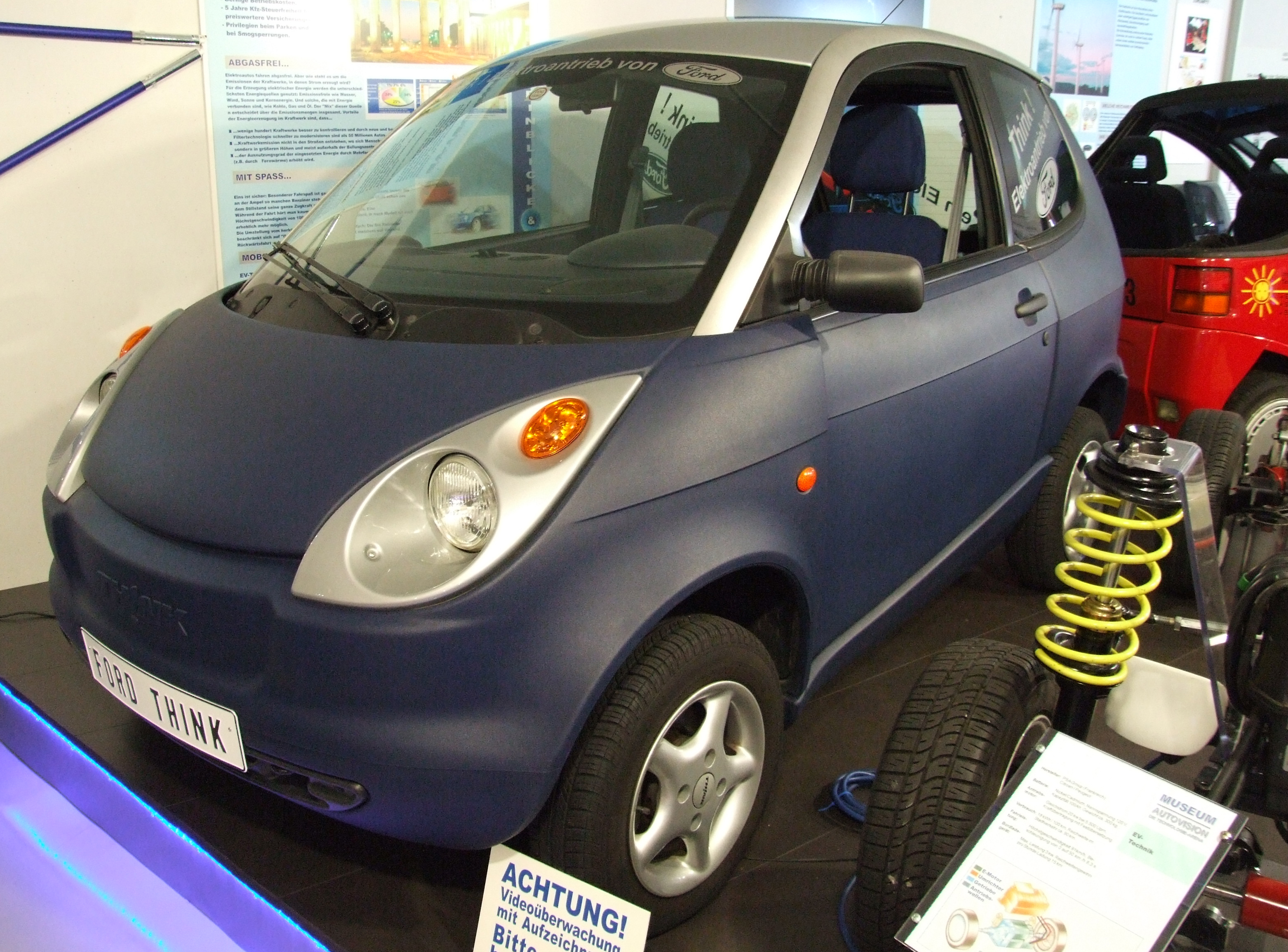
Ford TH!NK in Museum Autovision

Production ceased in 2002, after 1,005 units had been made. Many of these cars participated in station car projects in California and in New York City.

Probably due to changes in the California zero-emissions vehicle policy, Ford gave up THINK on January 31, 2003. The company was sold to KamKorp, owned by Indian businessman Kamal Siddiqi. Development of a successor to the City was subsequently halted. The used cars from US and UK have been re-exported to Norway where they are in high demand due to the government's policy to promote the use of electrical cars (EVs are exempt from taxes, have free parking, pass toll roads for free, and are allowed to drive in the bus lanes avoiding traffic congestion).

A controversy erupted when Ford decided to crush off-lease TH!NK City cars stockpiled in the U.S. After protesting by environmentalist groups, including a Greenpeace rally on the roof of Ford's Norway offices, Ford decided to ship the excess vehicles to Norway.

In 2004, the company turned its attention to development of the TH!NK public, a micro size electric bus to be rented to customers for inner city travel. By February 2006, prototypes of the vehicle had been developed, but the company went into receivership.

At the end of March 2006, Think Nordic was acquired by Norwegian investment group InSpire, which includes the original founder Jan Otto Ringdal and Jan-Olaf Willums - a Norwegian engineer educated at the ETH Zurich (Swiss Federal Polytechnic) - as partners. The company was renamed THINK Global.

For the next year, the THINK website showed a restyled "new THINK City" car which was under development. An open version of the car was also pictured but the company said it had no plans to put it into production.

In May 2007, Tesla Motors, maker of the electric Tesla Roadster, announced an agreement to sell 43 million dollars' worth of its Li-ion battery systems to THINK Nordic for use in the next generation THINK City, but on 2 November 2007 it backed out of the deal.

The THINK assembly line was restarted in late November 2007 to start manufacturing the re-designed City car.

On March 5, 2008, General Electric, battery manufacturer A123 Systems and THINK Global announced that they had entered a partnership to enable global electrification of transportation. GE invested US$4 million in THINK and $20 million in A123 Systems to help A123 roll out batteries for THINK. A123 Systems and THINK at the same time signed a commercial supply agreement. The partnership was announced at the 78th annual international Geneva Motor Show.

Also at the 2008 Geneva motor show, THINK unveiled its future five-seater, 130 km/h (80 mph) concept car, the TH!NK O_{x}.

In July 2008, THINK introduced the THINK City for the first time in the UK.

As of August 2008, some 100 City cars had been manufactured for customers in Norway. It was reported that "the lean plant is ready for efficient production supported by the experts of Porsche Consulting".

On December 15, 2008, THINK suspended all vehicle production and laid off 50% of its staff pending negotiation of up to $29 million in funding for working capital, citing "urgent financial distress."

As of January 13, 2009, THINK Global received a bridge loan of 40 million Norwegian kroner (~$5.69 million) to continue operation. Much of that bridge loan came from one of its battery suppliers, EnerDel.

On August 27, 2009, THINK announced a successful recapitalization ($47 million) through existing and new investors, which allowed the company to exit court protection and resume normal business operations in terms of manufacturing and sales of the THINK City EV in Europe. Announced investors included battery manufacturer EnerDel in U.S. (31%); US venture capital firms RockPort Capital Partners (Boston); Element Partners (Philadelphia) and Kleiner Perkins (Palo Alto, CA) as well as Valmet Automotive based in Finland and Investinor (the venture capital sovereign fund of Norway). On the same day, the company also announced that the THINK City electric car would be produced in Valmet later that year. The deal also included engineering. Valmet invested around €3 million ($4.27 million) to the project, and became a minor shareholder of the company.

Production of the THINK City car at Valmet Automotive started on December 10, 2009, in Uusikaupunki, Finland.

On January 5, 2010, THINK announced plans to manufacture the THINK City in Elkhart, Indiana beginning in 2011.

On April 6, 2010, THINK announced plans to begin selling the THINK City in the U.S. in 2010.

On December 2010, the first 15 THINK electric cars made in the Elkhart, Indiana, assembly plant were delivered to its customer – the state of Indiana – for government fleet use. This marks the first time that an American-made electric vehicle with Lithium-ion batteries has been purchased for U.S. fleet operation. The vehicles delivered were the THINK City model, which is a pure electric vehicle that produces zero emissions and is capable of traveling as far as 100 miles (160 km) on a single charge.

"Our delivery today is part of a larger effort to help transform the U.S. light-duty vehicle fleet from one that is mostly dependent on imported oil, to one that is fueled entirely by domestically produced electric energy," said Barry Engle, THINK CEO. Engle continued, "As part of that goal, we've made a strategic decision to target initially the many millions of fleet vehicles in operation in the U.S. market…These fleets can jumpstart vehicle electrification in America's cities and help push the industry past early adopters into mainstream consumer markets."

Production of the Th!nk City was stopped in March 2011 and the company filed for bankruptcy on June 22, 2011, for the fourth time in 20 years.

Think Global's assets were bought by Electric Mobility Solutions AS in July 2011, including shares of wholly owned subsidiaries THINK North America and THINK UK. The new owners announced that production is scheduled to restart in early 2012 with a refined Think City. However, despite such announcements production ceased in August 2012.

== Models ==
=== Ford TH!NK City ===
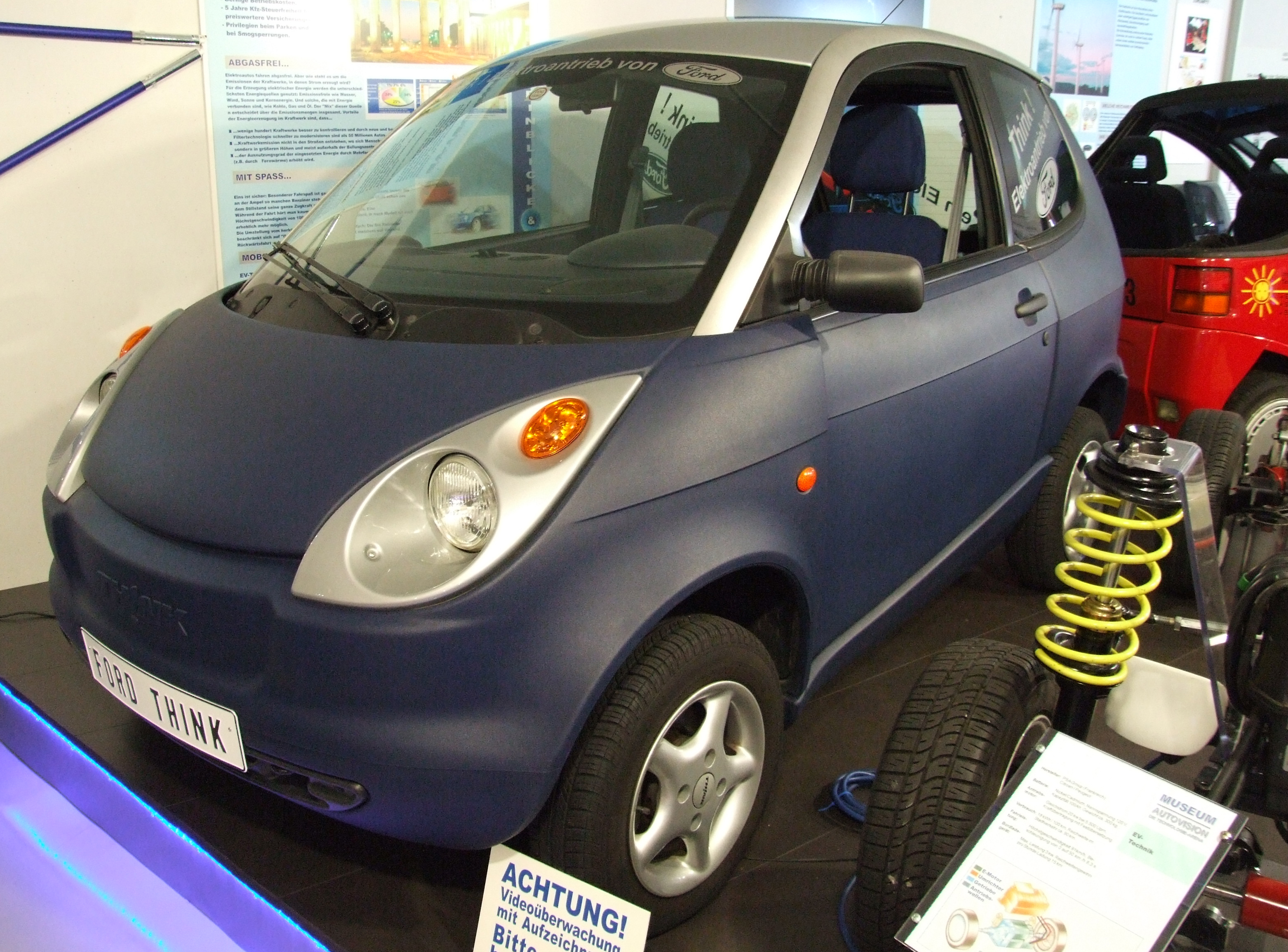
Ford TH!NK.

The two door Think City could seat a driver and a passenger and had a top speed of 56 miles per hour (90 km/h). The car had an acceleration speed of zero to 30 miles per hour (48 km/h) in seven seconds and weighed 2,075 pounds. The model was 9.8 feet (3.0 m) long, 5.25 feet (1.60 m) wide, and 5.1 feet (1.6 m) high.

=== TH!NK Neighbor ===
The Neighbor (part of Ford Th!nk) was designed to meet the NHTSA specification for Neighborhood Electric Vehicles. Design and manufacture was unrelated to the Th!nk City. The Neighbor was initially offered in two models, a two-seater and a four-seater, with a two-passenger utility truck version offered near the end of production. The TH!NK Neighbor had a fixed roof over an open enclosure; a rain cover was optionally available to protect the passengers from the elements.

The normal top speed was governed to 25 miles per hour (40 km/h) per NHTSA requirements, and it also had a "turf" mode that set its maximum speed at 15 miles per hour (24 km/h) for golf course use. Many options were designed for use on the golf course: it featured a bag rack, a holder for scorecards, tees, and balls, and a club washer. Additionally, there was a trunk option for the four-passenger version that could double as a cooler. Overall, 7,162 total units were produced for the 2002 model year. 2,268 P20 (2 seater), 863 P21 (utility) and 4,031 P22 (4 passenger) units were built.

=== TH!NK city ===
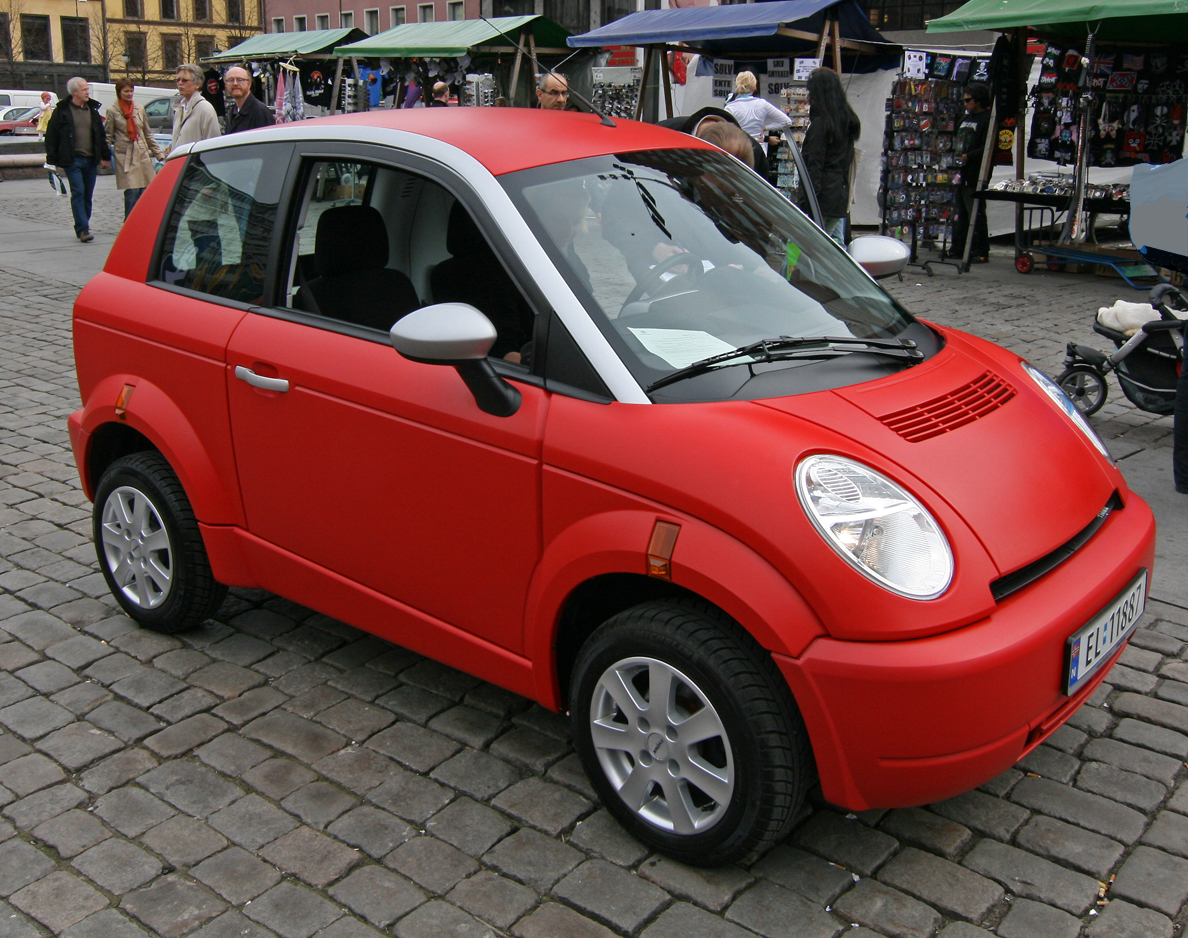
PIV5, Th!nk City electric car.

The Th!nk City was a small two-seater or 2+2-seater highway capable electric car, with a top speed of 110 kilometres per hour (68 mph) and an in-town range of 160 kilometres (99 mi) on a full charge. The Think City is available with either a Zebra Sodium (molten salt battery) battery or a lithium-ion battery, which both travel 100 miles, or 160 kilometres on a full charge, and based on the International Electrotechnical Commission's standards for electric cars.

After a failed start up in Norway in 2008, mass production was restarted in Finland in December 2009.

As of September 2010 the Th!nk City was sold in Norway, the Netherlands, Spain, France, Austria, Switzerland and Finland.

It was one of the first three electric cars in the world to be crash-tested and highway-certified, together with the Tesla Roadster (2008) and the Mitsubishi i MiEV.

=== TH!NK Ox ===
Think Ox

The TH!NK Ox, presented at the 2008 Geneva Motor Show, was a concept five-seater electric car with a top speed of 130 km/h (81 mph) and a 100 kW motor.

The website for the Think Ox, now shut down, listed the top speed as 135 km/h (~84 mi/h) and the range as 250 km (~155 mi).

=== TH!NK open ===
TH!NK open was a 3-door, 2-seat concept car, where the roof has been removed. Top speed is 100 km/h (62 mph), with the following ranges (90 to 203 km):

- Range IEC (European standard for calculating range of electrical cars): 170 km (summer tires, heater off)
- Range FUDS (American standard for calculating range of electrical cars): 180 km (summer tires, heater off)
- Range FUDS winter (typical range in particularly cold conditions) : 90 km /winter tires, constant 4 kW heater
- Range EU UDC (range during city driving only): 203 km (126 mi)

== See also ==
- Electric car
- Electric car use by country
- List of modern production plug-in electric vehicles
- Plug-in electric vehicle
  - Plug-in electric vehicles in Norway
