= Imprimis (disambiguation) =

Imprimis is a newsletter published by Hillsdale College since 1972.

Imprimis may also refer to:

- Imprimis, Inc., originally known as Boca Research, a defunct expansion card and modem manufacturer
- Imprimis Technology, a defunct hard disk drive manufacturer

== See also ==
- Imprimitivity
