= PowerBook 500 series =

Line of portable computers by Apple Computer

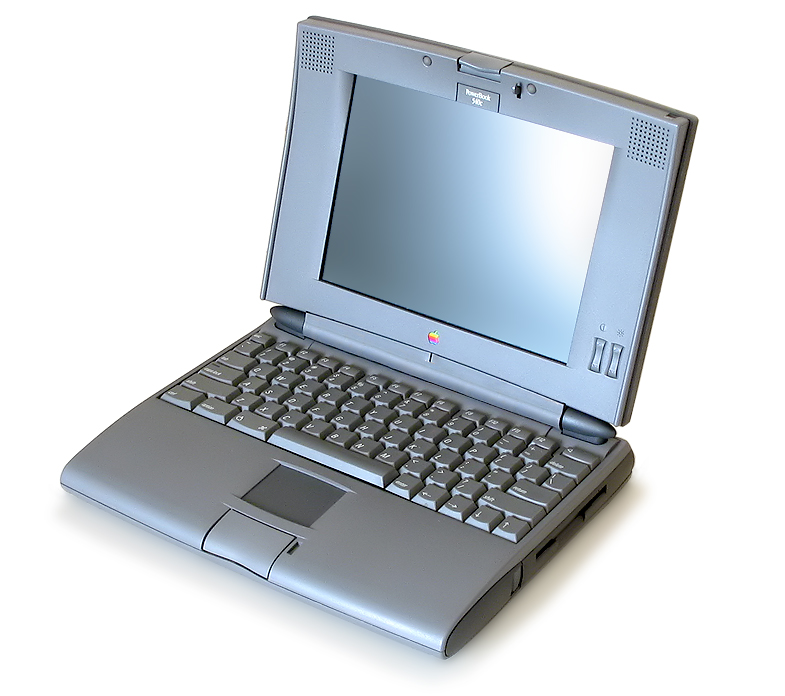
- The PowerBook 540c
- Developer: Apple Computer
- Manufacturer: Apple Computer
- Product family: PowerBook
- Type: Portable computer
- Released: May 16, 1994; 32 years ago
- Lifespan: 1.9 years
- Discontinued: April 1, 1996
- Operating system: System 7.1.1 – Mac OS 8.1
- CPU: 520: Motorola 68LC040 @ 25 MHz; 540: Motorola 68LC040 @ 33 MHz; 550c: Motorola 68040 @ 33 MHz
- Memory: 4 MB, expandable to 36 MB
- Storage: 160–750 MB
- Predecessor: PowerBook 100 series
- Successor: PowerBook 5300
- Related: PowerBook Duo series PowerBook 150

The door on the 550c is removed, and some trim on the 520c is removed, showing the external interfaces. Ports from left to right are: Power in, printer/modem, sound in, sound out, ADB, AAUI, monitor out, SCSI (HDI-30 connector), modem port, and Kensington key-lock. Note the 550c hinge cover is darker. Note the labels on the door needed to identify the internal modem (FCC info on the "PowerPort" label, Canadian on other two). The 100–240 V power supply is on top.

The PowerBook 500 series (codenamed Blackbird, which it shared with the older Macintosh IIfx) is a range of portable computers in the Macintosh family first introduced by Apple Computer with the 540c model on May 16, 1994. It was the first to have stereo speakers, a trackpad, and Ethernet networking built-in.

It was the first PowerBook series to use a Motorola 68LC040 CPU (simultaneous with Duo 280) and be upgradeable to the PowerPC architecture via a swap-out CPU daughter card (with the PowerPC and 68040 upgrades for sale), use 9.5-inch displays, 16-bit stereo sound with stereo speakers, have an expansion bay, PC Card capability, two battery bays (and a ten-minute sleep/clock battery, which allowed for main batteries to be swapped out while in sleep mode), full-size keyboard with F1–F12 function keys, be able to sleep while connected to an external monitor and have a battery contact cover included on the actual batteries. Furthermore, it included a single serial port, which could be used to connect to a serial printer or a network via Apple's LocalTalk. In another first, it also included an AAUI port for connecting to Ethernet networks.

The 500 series was discontinued completely with the introduction of the ill-fated PowerBook 5300. The PowerBook 190 was the de facto successor to the 500 and continued the only 68LC040 processor offering as the low end of the PowerPC-based PowerBook family.

In a survey taken in November 2000, Insanely Great Macintosh ranked the 540c No. 2 on its list of the all-time best PowerBook models made.

== History ==
The PowerBook 500 series was introduced on May 16, 1994, with the high-end active matrix LCD PowerBook 540c and 540, with the passive matrix 520c and 520 soon after. One of its marketing highlights was the promise of a PowerPC upgrade to its CPU and PC Card (PCMCIA) expansion. The introduction of this model came at the time of Apple's changeover to the new PowerPC chip from the 68k line of CPUs, and Apple's advertising and promise of the PowerPC was the cause of headaches to the company. The strong demand for its ground-breaking design and Apple's incorrect market prediction that customers would wait for the fully PowerPC PowerBooks resulted in shortages early on.

In August 1995 the 540 was dropped from the line, 8 MB of additional memory and the modem was offered installed from the factory, hard drive capacity was increased (from 160 and 240 to 320 and 500 MB), and the installed system upped from System 7.1.1 to 7.5. The PC Card Cage was also released, allowing Macintosh users to add PCMCIA capability to their laptops for the first time.

In 1995, Apple Japan introduced an updated version, called the 550c, with a bigger display (10.4-inches), CPU with FPU (68040), bigger hard drive, and Japanese keyboard with black case. It was only sold in Japan and never received FCC certification.

With delays for the new PowerPC PowerBook 5300, demand for the PPC upgrade mounted, and Newer Technology began to market the upgrade before Apple did, although they had produced the upgrade modules for Apple first. They also offered 117 MHz versions over Apple's "100 MHz" (actually 99 MHz) offering. Soon thereafter, Newer Technology introduced a 167 MHz model that outperformed the fastest PowerBook 5300, the $6,800 5300ce, at a time when problems with that line became a real issue to Apple.

About the time Apple introduced the PowerBook 1400, Newer Technology introduced a 183 MHz upgrade with 128 KB of L2 cache that kept it ahead of the power curve in performance. Newer Technology stated they could not produce more of the 183 MHz upgrades because the supply of connectors was exhausted.

== Impact on the industry ==
The PowerBook 500 series was the first portable computer series to include several features that would later became common in portable computers, including 16-bit stereo audio at 44.1 kHz, built-in stereo speakers, a trackpad, Ethernet connectivity (through AAUI), and intelligent nickel–metal hydride battery packs with onboard circuitry to monitor battery condition. The processor was installed on a daughter card, allowing the CPU module to be replaced.

Within Apple's PowerBook lineup, the series introduced several additional features, including a standard Motorola 68LC040 processor, an optional PowerPC 603e processor upgrade, 10.4-inch displays, dual-scan displays, and PC Card support through an expansion module. The computer had two battery bays, one of which included a PDS connector that could be used with expansion modules. The bay could accept devices such as Ethernet adapters and video cards.

Other features included a separate battery for maintaining system sleep and clock functions, a full-size keyboard with function keys, support for sleep mode while connected to an external monitor, and battery contact covers included with the battery packs.

== Engineering ==
=== Variations across the range ===
Although the 500 "Blackbird" prototypes were black, only one of the five production models was completely black; that was the 550c, sold only in Japan. The 550c differed from the four two-tone grey models in a few other key respects as well, including a larger active-matrix color screen, a combined Latin/Kana keyboard, and a full 68040 processor. The other models were all charcoal grey with darker grey trim, came with a variety of displays (active/passive matrix; color or greyscale), and used the 68LC040 processor (a low-cost variant without a math coprocessor). The full-sized keyboard with 12 function keys, and 640×480 resolution display was consistent across the family.

=== Optional internal modem ===
The modem was developed with Global Village, and is a unique two-part design. The transceiver with the modem connector is installed in the back, and the modem itself is located next to the CPU daughter card. It was a V.32terbo, and had a top rate of 19.2 KB/s, but only with other V.32terbo modems as there was no official standard. Otherwise, it would drop to 14.4 KB/s. Due to a bug with the new combined printer/modem port, the driver had to be upgraded to 2.5.5, and the Chooser was replaced in the GV install.

== Expansion bay ==
The 500 series of PowerBooks included the ability to use two batteries at the same time, allowing for 4 hours of battery life from two installed charged batteries. However, the left battery also had an internal PDS slot that allowed for custom modules to be installed. Despite prototypes having been made, only two devices reached the market.

=== PCMCIA "card cage" ===
One is the PCMCIA module. There were three versions; RevA, RevB and RevC. The RevC is the most useful as it can take 16bit Wi-Fi cards, allowing the possibility to get a Powerbook 5xx connected online or in the home network using a technology that was developed after the Powerbook 5xxs were discontinued by Apple. The different revisions of the PCMCIA module were released by Apple to accommodate the developing PCMCIA standard. These modules are difficult to find, and the RevC module is in particular demand because it alone works with 16-bit WiFi cards.
PC Card (PCMCIA) cage, 16-bit, 2 Type I/II or 1 Type III cards, using a 68000 CPU to convert the PC Card protocol to PDS.

=== FPU coprocessor ===
The other is the FPU coprocessor, to make up for the lack of one in the PowerBook's 68LC040 CPU. The FPU module uses a 68882 FPU coprocessor made by Sonnet.

== Production ==
In total, almost 600,000 PowerBook 500 series units were produced, compared to 300,000 PowerBook 5300 units.

== Models ==
According to Apple, all of these models are obsolete. (Note: Apple products that have been discontinued for 7 years and no longer receive hardware support or spare parts)

| | | 520 | 520c | 540 | 540c | 550c |
|---|---|---|---|---|---|---|
| Timeline | Introduced | May 16, 1994 | | | | May 30, 1995 |
| Timeline | Discontinued | June 10, 1995 | September 16, 1995 | October 17, 1994 | August 26, 1995 | April 1, 1996 |
| Model | Model no. | M4880 | | | | |
| Model | Gestalt ID | 72 | | | | |
| Model | Codename | "BlackBird LC" | | "BlackBird," "SR-71," "Spruce Goose" | | "Banzai" |
| Model | Order no. | M3981 | M3984 | M2807 | M2809 | M4286 |
| Performance | CPU | 68LC040 | | | | 68040 |
| Performance | CPU speed | 25 MHz | | 33 MHz | | |
| Performance | RAM | 4 MB (expandable to 36 MB) | | | | |
| Hard drive | | 160 or 240 MB | 160, 240, or 320 MB | 240 or 320 MB | 240 or 320 MB, later 500 MB | 750 MB |
| Video | Size | 9.5 in (240 mm) | | | | 10.4 in (260 mm) |
| Video | Colors | 16 grays | 256 | 64 grays (Note: 64 grays, though can be set to 256 grays.) | Thousands (Note: 32,768 colors at 640×400, or 256 colors at regular 640×480) | |
| Video | Method | Dual-scan passive | | Active | | |
| Video | Resolution | 640×480 | | | | |
| OS | Original | 7.1.1 | | | | 7.5 |
| OS | Maximum | 8.1 | | | | |

== Video display support ==
PowerBook 520c and 550c, showing the difference in display size

This a listing of all the resolutions and colors supported.

| Resolution | Frequency | Monitor type | LCD bit depth | External bit depth |
|---|---|---|---|---|
| 512×384 | 60 Hz | MultiSync | —N/a | 8-bit (256 color/gray) |
| 640×400 | ? | built-in LCD | 15-bit (32,768 color/gray) | —N/a |
| 640×480 | 67 Hz | VGA | 8-bit (256 color/gray) | 8-bit (256 color/gray) |
| 640×870 | 75 Hz | Macintosh Portrait Display | —N/a | 8-bit (256 gray) |
| 800×600 | 56 Hz | SVGA | —N/a | 8-bit (256 color/gray) |
| 832×624 | 75 Hz | MultiSync | —N/a | 8-bit (256 color/gray) |
| 1024×768 | 60 Hz | XVGA/VESA | —N/a | 4-bit (16 gray) |

== CPU upgrades ==
| Model | Sonnet | M3081LL/A | NUpowr 117 | NUpowr 167 | NUpowr 183 | NUpowr G3 |
|---|---|---|---|---|---|---|
| Maker | Sonnet | Apple | Newer Technology | | | |
| Processor | 68040 | PowerPC 603e | | PowerPC 603ev | | PowerPC 740 |
| CPU speed | 66/33 MHz | 100 MHz | 117 MHz | 167 MHz | 183 MHz | 233 MHz‡ |
| L2 cache | —N/a | | | | 128 kB | 512 kB‡ |
| Included RAM (MB) | 4 MB | 8 MB | 0, 4, or 8 MB | 0 or 8 MB | 0 or 24 MB† | 24 MB‡ |
| Produced | unknown | 6,000 | "excess of 15,000" of all types of NUpowr versions | | | (prototypes only) |
† To fit the additional RAM in, removal of the modem daughter card is required. ‡ Newer Technology never divulged the specifications for the G3 upgrade; estimate based on current technology.

== Legacy ==
Most laptops had grayscale displays, mono speakers with only 8-bit audio out, and insufficient battery life, and some had side-mounted snap-on track balls. With the built-in Ethernet (via a versatile AAUI transceiver), SCSI port (forerunner of today’s FireWire) and ADB (similar to USB), it had all the features of desktops at that time, making them the first viable desktop replacement laptops.

== In popular culture ==
- Sandra Bullock prominently uses a PowerBook 540c (and also a PowerBook Duo 280c) in the movie The Net (1995).
- The Powerbook 540c is used by both Antonio Banderas and Sylvester Stallone in the movie Assassins (1995 film).

== Timeline ==
Timeline of portable Macintoshes
See also: List of Mac models
