= Apple Attachment Unit Interface =

Apple version of the standard Ethernet connection

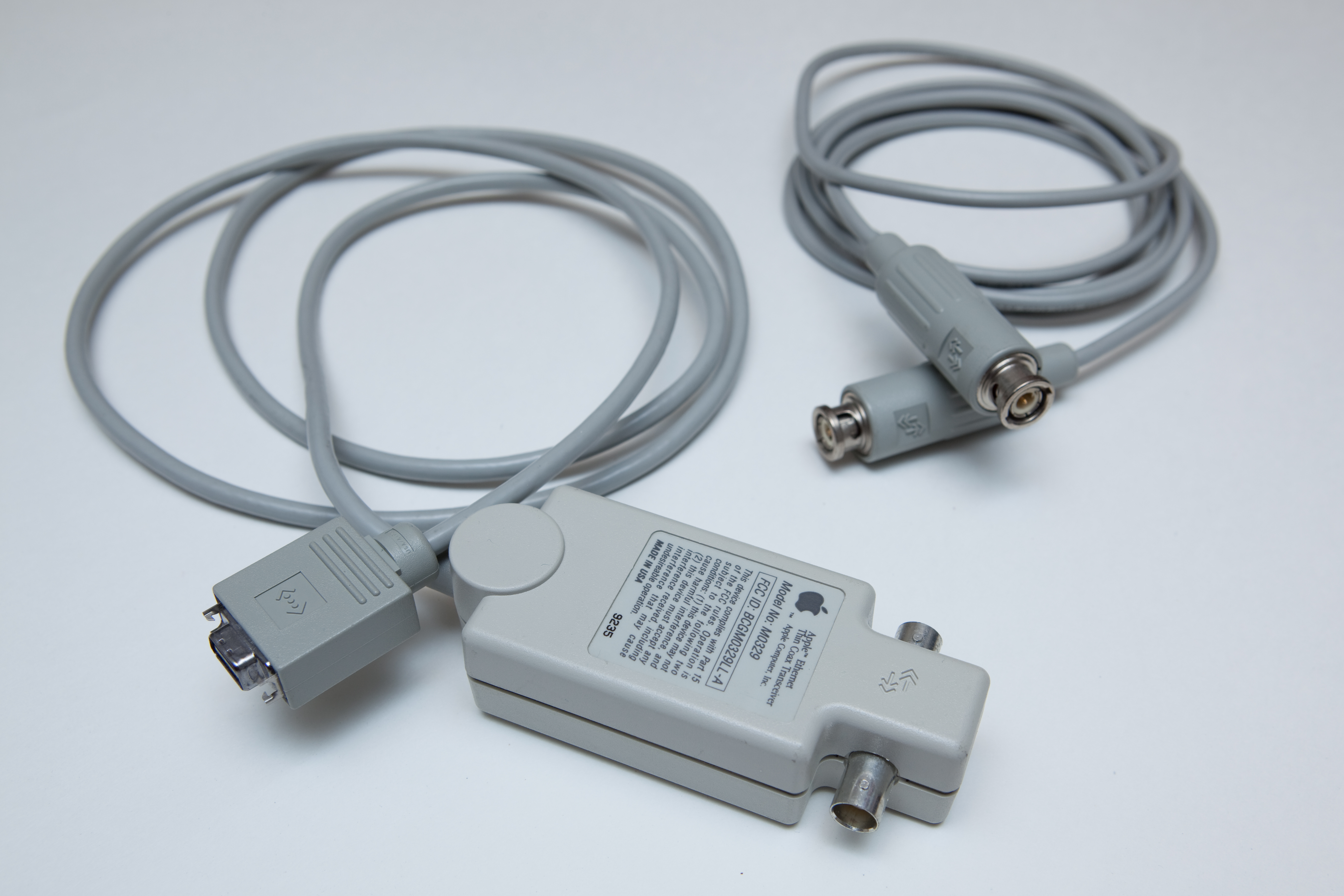
AAUI transceiver for 10BASE2 with cable

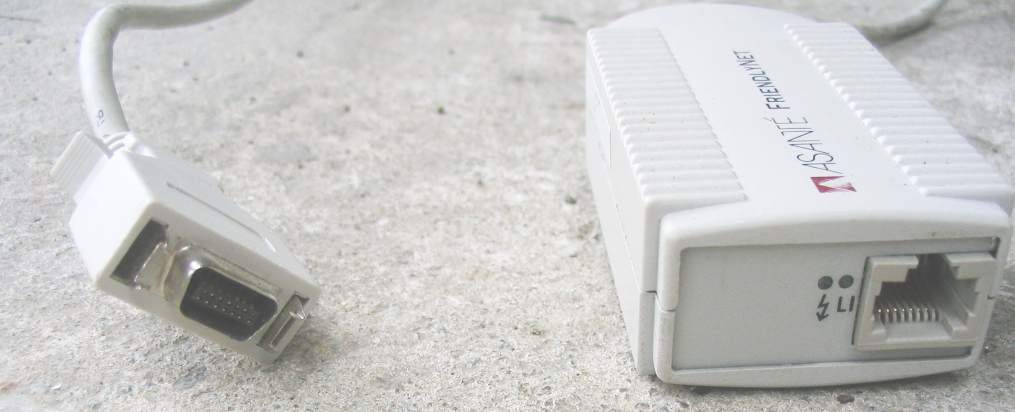
AAUI transceiver for 10BASE-T

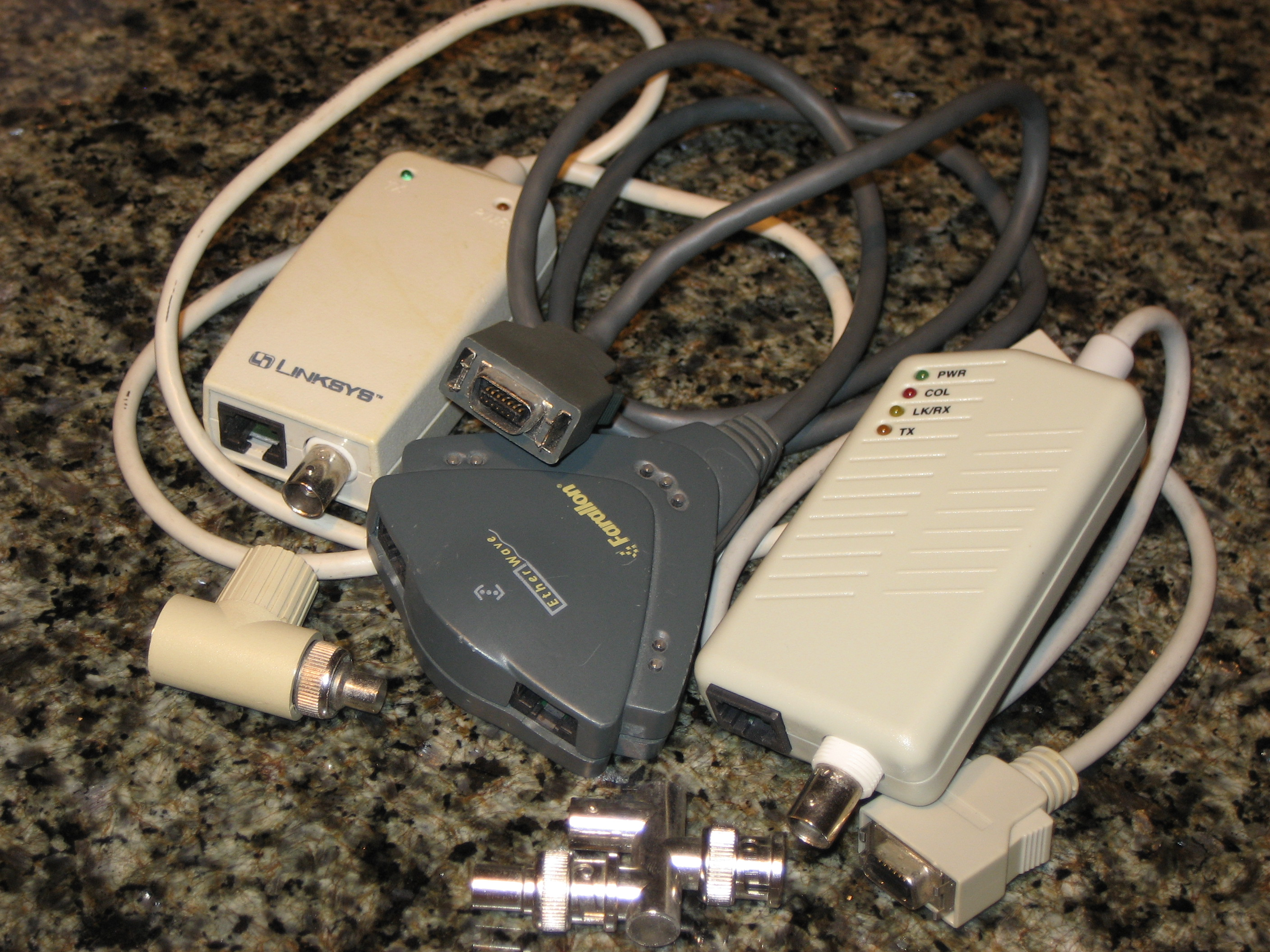
Two AAUI 10BASE2/10BASE-T combo transceivers (Linksys MACT2T and LL8-LEENET-C) and an AAUI dual 10BASE-T transceiver that is actually a three-port hub (Farallon)

Apple Attachment Unit Interface (AAUI) is a mechanical re-design by Apple of the standard Attachment Unit Interface (AUI) used to connect computer equipment to Ethernet. The AUI was popular in the era before the dominance of 10BASE-T networking that started in the early 1990s; the AAUI was an attempt to make the connector much smaller and more user friendly, though the proprietary nature of the interface was also criticized.

== FriendlyNet ==
AAUI is part of a system of Ethernet peripherals intended to make connecting over Ethernet easier. At the time of the introduction of AAUI, Ethernet systems usually were 10BASE2, also known as thinnet. Apple's system is called FriendlyNet. A FriendlyNet 10BASE2 system does not use BNC T-connectors or separate 50 Ω terminators. Instead of a single BNC connector that is inserted into a T-connector placed inline, the FriendlyNet transceiver has two BNC connectors, one on each side, to which the cables are attached. The transceiver automatically terminates the network if a cable is missing from either side. Additionally, Apple 10BASE2 cables terminate the network when no device is attached to them. Thus the number of mistakes that could be made hooking up a thinnet network is reduced considerably. Since any of these mistakes can disable the network segment, this presents a significant improvement.

FriendlyNet equipment was expensive. Because of this, Apple's computers, billed as having built-in Ethernet, were expensive to connect to Ethernet, perhaps adding as much as a tenth to the total price of the computer system. Additionally, AAUI held no advantage for any system other than 10BASE2, and thus as 10BASE-T became ubiquitous it became impossible to justify the cost of an external transceiver. Apple eventually abandoned the system and sold off the name.

Macintosh Quadra, Centris, PowerBook 500, Duo Dock II (for PowerBook Duo) and early Power Macintoshes have AAUI ports, which require external transceivers. By the time AAUI was nearing the end of its life, the cost of an AAUI transceiver became a burden for consumers. Later models include both AAUI and modular connector ports for directly connecting 10BASE-T; either can be used, but not both at the same time. AAUI connectors are also present on some Processor Direct Slot Ethernet adapter cards used in Macintosh LC and Performa machines. AAUI had disappeared by the late 1990s, when new Apple machines, starting with the beige Power Macintosh G3 series, include only the modular connector ports.

== Third-party vendors ==
Many third parties also created AAUI transceivers. Most made simplifications to the connectors and cables, presumably to reduce costs. Most third parties, as well as any non-Apple equipment, would use standard 10BASE2 cabling, including T-connectors and manual termination. Additionally, Apple's 10BASE2 cables were not appropriate for all uses since they only came in fixed lengths and the ends were not detachable, making it difficult to wire them through walls. Unfortunately, when mixing and matching Apple and non-Apple 10BASE2 devices, there were many seemingly natural configurations of cables and connectors which would cause the network to become unreliable or unusable in the area, reducing the value of the complex and proprietary Apple 10BASE2 wiring system.

== Connector and signals ==
AUI uses a DA-15 connector and a sliding clip to mechanically secure the connection. AAUI replaces these with a small 14-position, 0.05-inch-spaced ribbon contact connector. This connector may have been chosen to avoid confusion with the monitor port on early Macintoshes, which also uses a DA-15. The connector locks into position using two clips or hooks on the sides of the connector outside of the shell which automatically clicks on when plugged in, and can be removed by pulling back on a sliding sheath over the body of the connector, disengaging the hooks. Third-party AAUI devices often omit this sheath, requiring the user to directly squeeze small tabs on the sides of the plug housing to detach the hooks.

AAUI signals have the same description, function, and electrical requirements as the Attachment Unit Interface (AUI) signals of the same name, as detailed in IEEE 802.3-1990 CSMA/CD Standard, section 7, with the exception that most hosts provide only 5 volts of power rather than the 12 volts required for most AUI transceivers. An adapter containing a power supply to provide the required 12 volts was available from Apple to permit connection of standard AUI transceivers to an AAUI port. This facilitated direct connection to 10BASE-F (fibre optic) and 10BASE5 (ThickNet) Ethernet networks, for which AAUI transceivers were not available.

AAUI pin-out
Pin	Signal name	Signal description
1	FN Pwr	Power (+12 V @ 2.1 W or +5 V @ 1.9 W)
2	DI-A	Data In, circuit A
3	DI-B	Data In, circuit B
4	VC	Voltage Common
5	CI-A	Control In, circuit A
6	CI-B	Control In, circuit B
7	+5 V	+5 volts (from host)
8	+5 V	Secondary +5 volts (from host)
9	DO-A	Data Out, circuit A
10	DO-B	Data Out, circuit B
11	VC	Secondary Voltage Common
12	NC	Reserved
13	NC	Reserved
14	FN Pwr	Secondary +12 V @ 2.1 W or +5 V @ 1.9 W
Shell	Protective Gnd	Protective Ground

== See also ==
Media related to Apple Attachment Unit Interface at Wikimedia Commons
