= Boca Research =

American computer company

Inprimis, Inc.
- Formerly: Boca Research, Inc. (1985–2001)
- Company type: Public
- Industry: Computer
- Founded: January 1985; 40 years ago in Boca Raton, Florida
- Founder: Tim Farris
- Defunct: January 2002; 23 years ago
- Fate: Acquired by Ener1
- Products: Peripherals
- Number of employees: 330 (1996, peak)

Boca Research, Inc., later Inprimis, Inc., was an American computer company based in Boca Raton, Florida, and active between 1985 and 2002. The company manufactured a variety of expansion cards for the IBM PC and compatible systems, including memory cards, networking cards, sound cards, and graphics cards. Once a major player in the computer networking market, being the fourth-largest manufacturer of modems in 1996, Boca Research abandoned the PC hardware market entirely amid falling market share and manufactured set-top boxes in the last years of its existence.

== History ==
=== Foundation (1985–1992) ===
Boca Research, Inc., was founded by Tim Farris in 1985 and incorporated in Boca Raton, Florida. Farris had previously co-founded Quadram Corporation, which was one of the first companies to manufacture expansion cards for the IBM PC, with Leland Strange in 1981. After selling off Quadram in 1984 and resigning from the company, Farris took a sabbatical and moved to Boca Raton in 1984. Shortly thereafter, he founded Boca Research, having closely watched the burgeoning personal computer industry intently and being exasperated at the cost of expansion cards at the time, which had not gone down significantly despite the PC architecture quickly commodifying. He incorporated Boca Research four blocks away from IBM's manufacturing complex in the city, where the IBM PC was developed. Boca Research benefited from their location due to the large number of engineers and developers in the city and from the cross-pollination of talent coming from IBM.

Boca's first products were low-cost memory expansion cards for the IBM PC. The company was initially slow to develop new products; between 1985 and 1989, for example, the company introduced only 10 products. Farris' philosophy was to wait until initial interest in new expansion technologies had waned so that they could bulk purchase parts necessary for their creation at a lower cost. In 1989, the company expanded its portfolio of products significantly, introducing its first graphics cards and its first Micro Channel memory cards. Employment at the company expanded in turn to 50 workers by the end of the year, the company also increased the square-footage of their headquarters by 50 percent. By the early 1990s, the company had expanded its manufacturing presence to the bordering city of Delray Beach, Florida, opening up a factory there. In 1991, the company entered the networking market, manufacturing modems for personal computers.

=== Expansion and IPO (1992–1996) ===
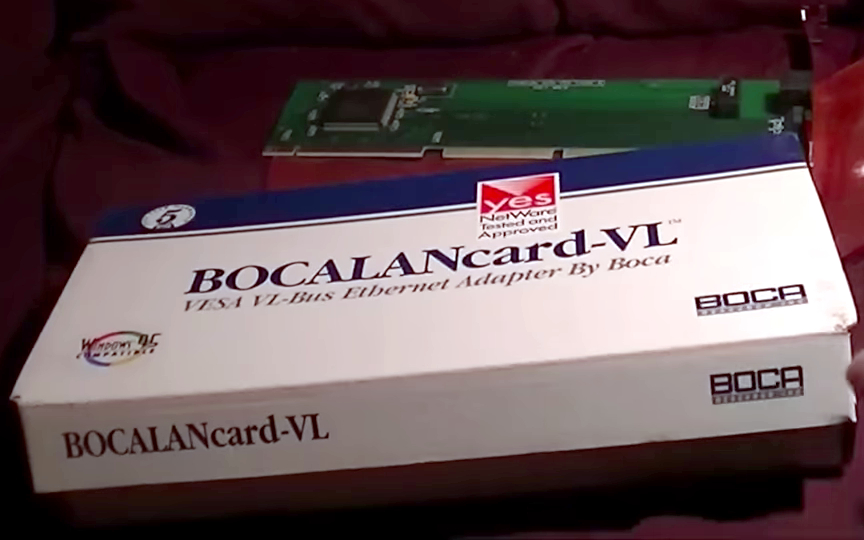
BOCALANcard-VL, VESA Local Bus local area networking card from 1994

Boca Research filed its initial public offering on the stock market in February 1992. Price per share rose from $8 to $14 between February 1993 to March 1993 following good sales in the quarter. In 1993, the company posted gross sales of $44.5 million. Despite healthy sales, reports of shrinking profit margins in the company in 1994—stemming from increased competition in the fax modem networking market where Boca had specialized in the preceding years—caused the stock to decline in June 1994. In an attempt to stem falling profits, Boca Research opened two more production lines in their Delray Beach plant and planned to hire between 50 and 60 workers in order to improve production efficiency. Employment at the company eventually peaked at 330 in 1996.

In May 1993, Boca Research acquired The Complete PC, Inc., a manufacturer of image scanners, fax and voice modems, and other peripherals for personal computers.

In September 1994, Farris stepped down as president and CEO, hiring Anthony Zalenski—then recently of Universal Data Systems, the modem manufacturing division of Motorola—to fill the role. In April 1995, Farris resigned as chairman of the company, citing a change in life plans. He was replaced with E. Roe Stamps IV, who had been a director in the company since 1992. Farris remained on the board of directors.

In June 1995, the company introduced SoundExpression, the company's first foray into sound cards. SoundExpression was a multifunction card: in addition to providing wavetable and FM synthesis audio for multimedia applications, the card also served as a networking modem, a fax modem, and a voicemail device. The SoundExpression made use of an audio chipset designed by Crystal Semiconductor.

Also in June 1995, Boca Research began talks with Hayes Microcomputer Products, a pioneering personal computer modem manufacturer, to acquire the latter for $75 million. Hayes had entered Chapter 11 bankruptcy that year; had the merger gone through, it would have created the third-largest manufacturer of modems, according to The New York Times. However, merger negotiations dissolved two months later, Boca blaming the collapse of the deal on Hayes talking with other potential merger candidates during their negotiations against Boca's wishes. Dennis Hayes, chairman of Hayes, accused Boca of strong-arming. Boca ended up acquiring Global Village Communication, a manufacture of networking products for Apple's Macintosh, in June 1998 for $10 million. They in turn sold the Global Village division to Zoom Telephonics in 2000.

=== Decline, name change, and acquisition (1996–2002) ===
Boca Research ranked the fourth largest manufacturer of modems in mid-1996. Despite this, Boca's bottom line suffered throughout the year as faster, 56 kbit/s modems had proliferated too quick for Boca to compete with. The company delivered their first 56 kbit/s modem in March 1997, but by then it was too late. With computer system manufacturers simultaneously deciding to include internal modem cards from Boca's competitors, its annual profits dropped sharply—falling from $153 million in fiscal year 1996 to $70 million in fiscal years 1997 and 1998. Under Zalenski, Boca attempt a turnaround by pivoting to software development, and, later, the manufacture of Web access set-top boxes for television sets. Zalenski resigned as CEO from the company in January 2000, being replaced by Robert W. Ferguson.

In October 2000, Boca Research's name was changed to Inprimis, Inc., adopting the name of Boca's set-top box manufacturing division for the entire company. Inprimis was acquired by Ener1 in January 2002.
