= PowerBook =

Series of Apple laptops based on PowerPC and Motorola 68000

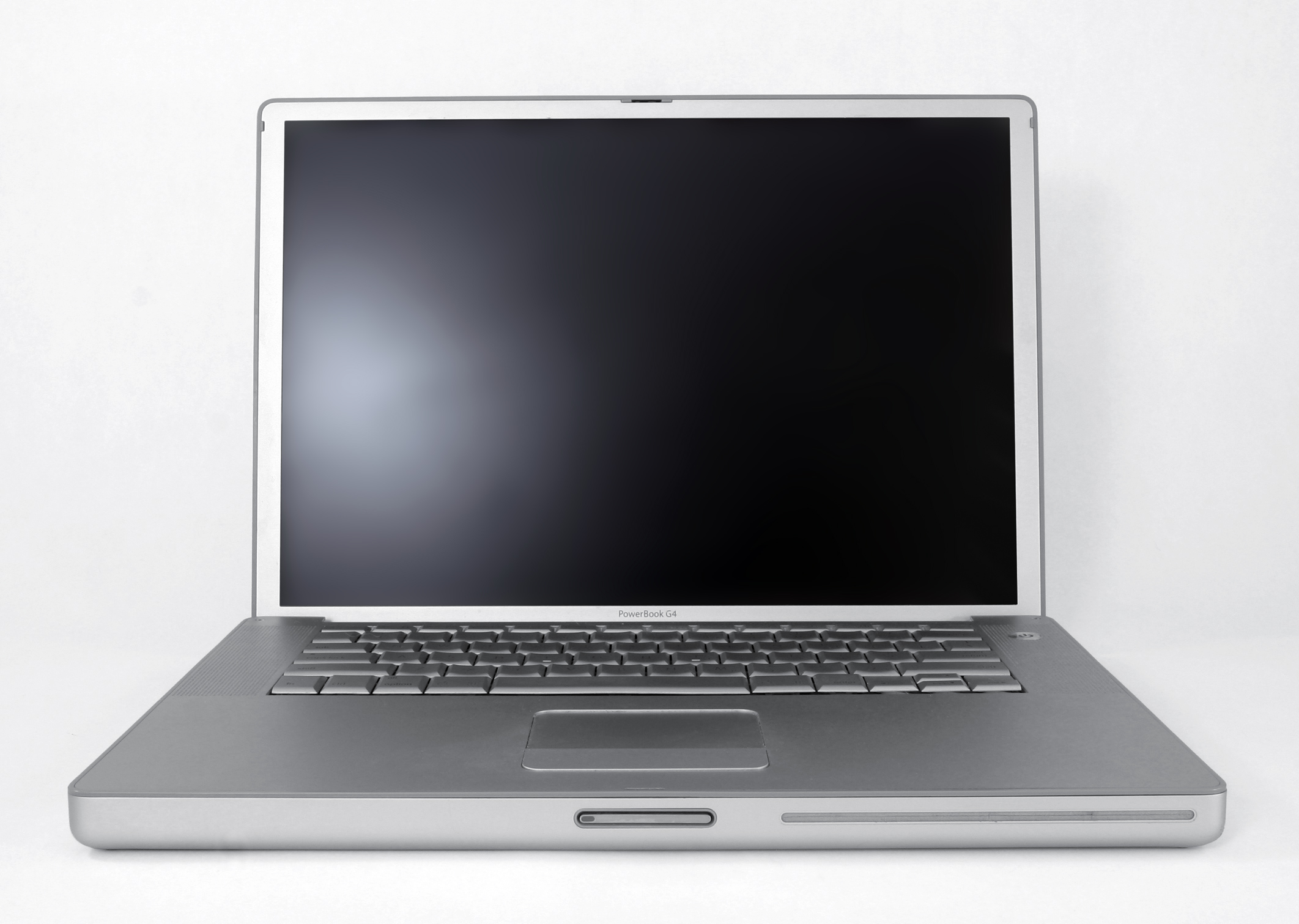
- PowerBook G4, the last PowerBook
- Developer: Apple Computer
- Product family: Macintosh
- Type: Laptop
- Released: October 21, 1991
- Discontinued: May 16, 2006
- Operating system: Mac OS
- Display: LCD
- Predecessor: Macintosh Portable
- Successor: MacBook Pro
- Related: iBook, Power Macintosh

The PowerBook (known as Macintosh PowerBook before 1997) is a family of Macintosh-type laptop computers designed, manufactured and sold by Apple Computer from 1991 to 2006. It was targeted at the professional market; in 1999, the line was supplemented by the home and education-focused iBook family.

During its lifetime, the PowerBook went through several major revisions and redesigns, often being the first to incorporate features that would later become standard in competing laptops. The PowerBook was replaced by the MacBook Pro in 2006 as part of the Mac transition to Intel processors.

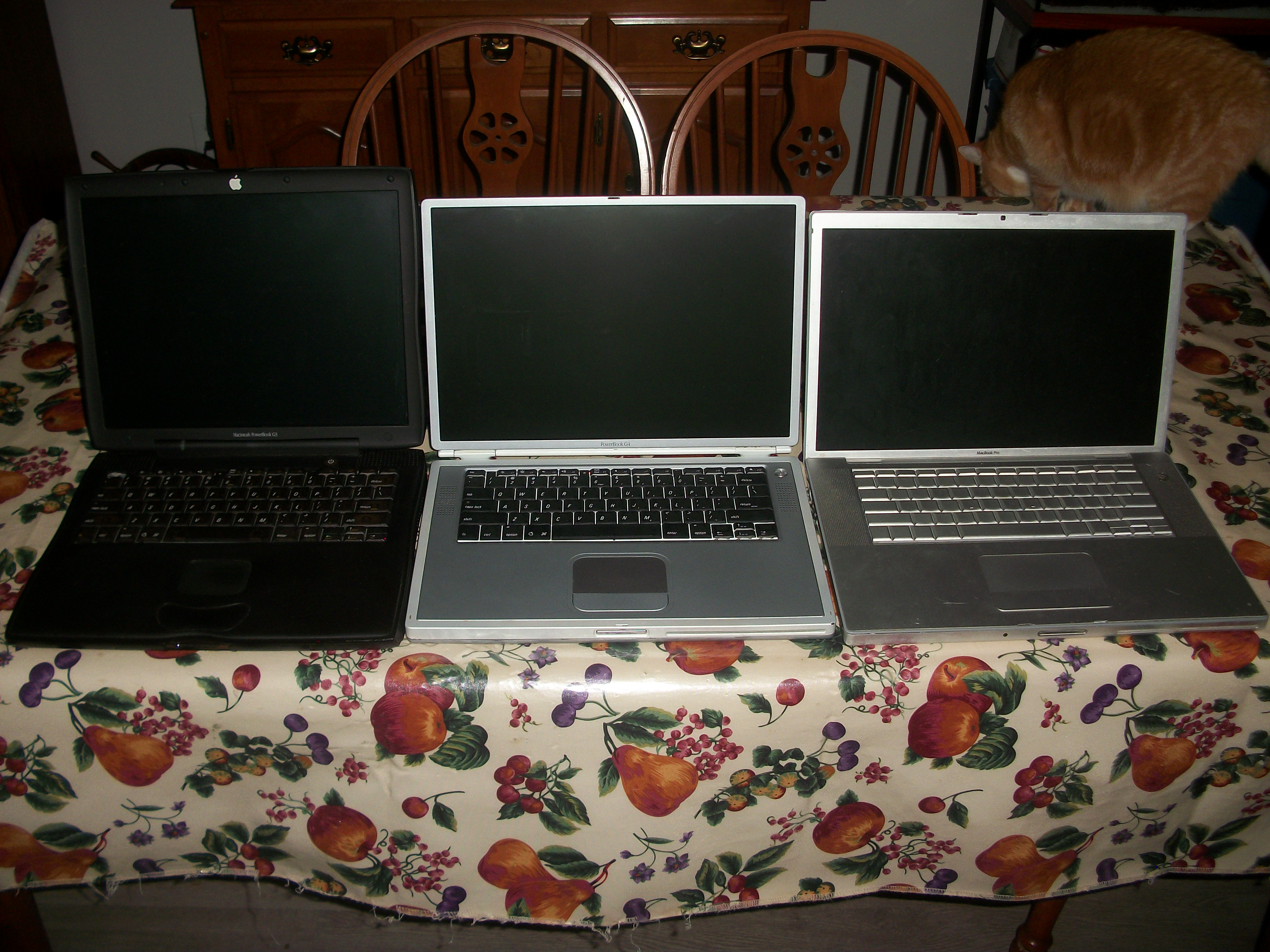
A comparison of the "Pismo" PowerBook G3, Titanium PowerBook G4 and the superseding MacBook Pro from 2006.

== 680x0-based models ==
=== PowerBook 100 series ===
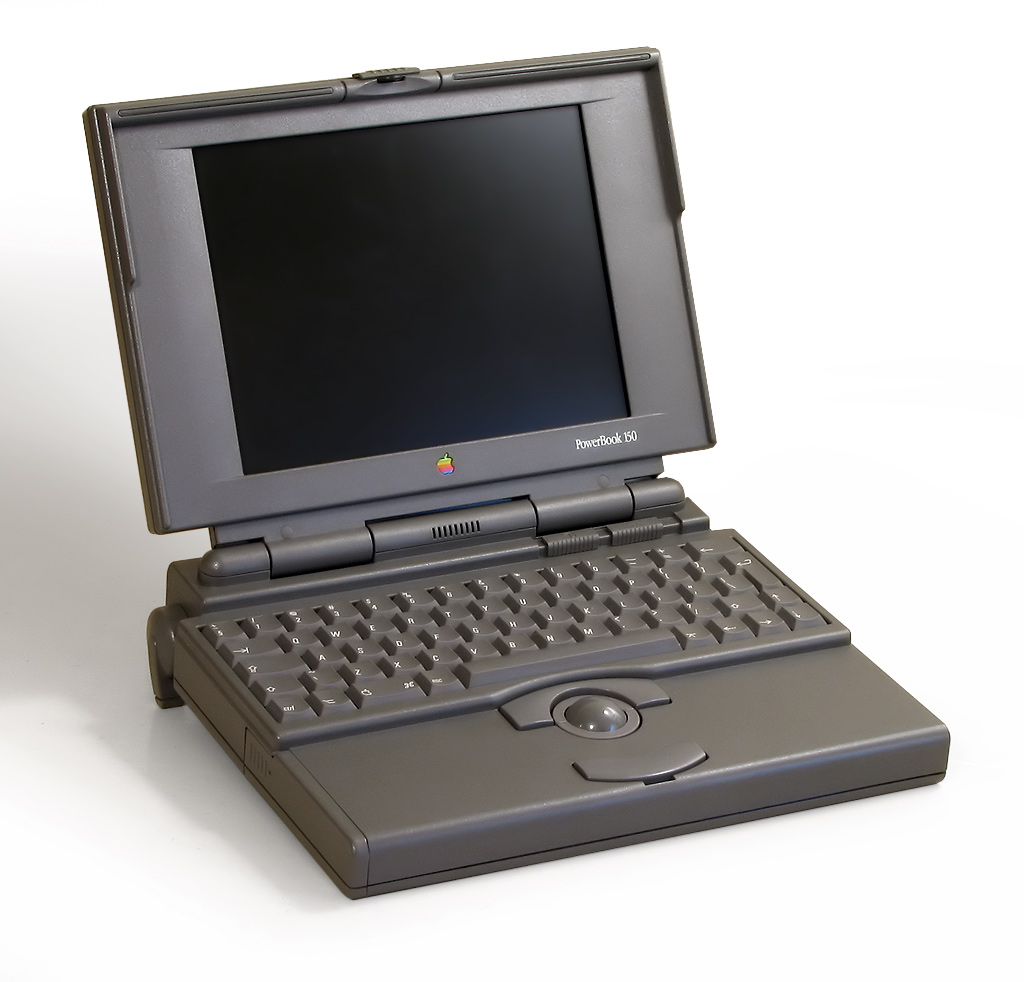
The PowerBook 150

In October 1991, Apple released the PowerBook line with the entry-level PowerBook 100, the mid-range PowerBook 140, and the high-end PowerBook 170. The PowerBook line was commercially successful, and its industrial design influenced later notebook computers. The systems featured compact dark gray cases, a built-in trackball, and a keyboard placed toward the back of the case to provide space for palm rests. Many competing portable computers at the time retained forward-mounted keyboards with empty space behind them, often used for function key reference cards, and some required external clip-on trackballs. As graphical user interfaces replaced command-line interfaces, the PowerBook's arrangement became the standard layout for later notebook computers.

The cases for the PowerBook 140 and 170 were designed by Apple, while the PowerBook 100 was designed by Sony, which used Apple's schematics for the Macintosh Portable and miniaturized its components.

The 100 series PowerBooks were intended to tie into the rest of the Apple desktop products utilizing the corporate Snow White design language incorporated into all product designs since 1986. Unlike the Macintosh Portable, however, which was essentially a battery-powered desktop in weight and size, the light colors and decorative recessed lines did not seem appropriate for the scaled-down designs. In addition to adopting a darker grey color scheme that coordinated with the official corporate look, they also adopted a raised series of ridges mimicking the indented lines on the desktops. The innovative look not only unified their entire product line, but set Apple apart in the marketplace. These early series would be the last to utilize the aging Snow White look, with the 190 adopting a new look along with the introduction of the 500 series.

The first series of PowerBooks were hugely successful, capturing 40% of all laptop sales. However, the original team left to work at Compaq. When attempting to increase processing power, Apple was hampered by the overheating problems of the 68040; this resulted in the 100-series PowerBook being stuck with the aging 68030, which could not compete with newer-generation Intel 80486-based PC laptops introduced in 1994. For several years, new PowerBook and PowerBook Duo computers were introduced that featured incremental improvements, including color screens, but by mid-decade, most other companies had copied the majority of the PowerBook's features. Apple was unable to ship a 68040-equipped PowerBook until the PowerBook 500 series in 1994.

The original PowerBook 100, 140, and 170 were replaced by the 145 (updated to the 145B in 1993), 160, and 180 in 1992. The 160 and 180 have video output, allowing them to drive an external monitor.

In 1993, the PowerBook 165c was the first PowerBook with a color screen, later followed by the 180c. In 1994, the last true member of the 100-series form factor introduced was the PowerBook 150, targeted at value-minded consumers and students.

The PowerBook 190, released in 1995, bears no resemblance to the rest of the PowerBook 100 series, and is in fact simply a Motorola 68LC040-based version of the PowerBook 5300 (and the last Macintosh model to utilize a Motorola 68k-family processor).

=== PowerBook Duo ===
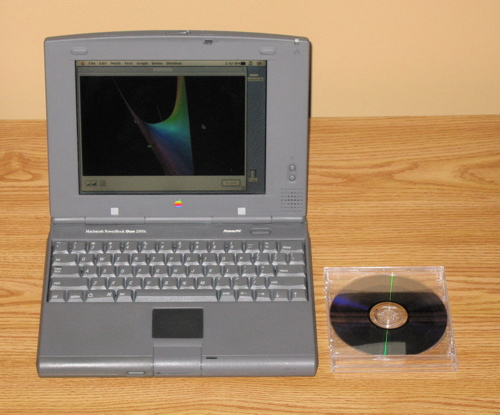
The PowerBook Duo 2300c

In 1992, Apple released a hybrid portable/desktop computer, the PowerBook Duo, continuing to streamline the subnotebook features introduced with the PowerBook 100. The Duos were a series of very thin and lightweight laptops with a minimum of features, which could be inserted into a docking station to provide the system with extra video memory, storage space, connectors, and could be connected to a monitor.

=== PowerBook 500 series ===
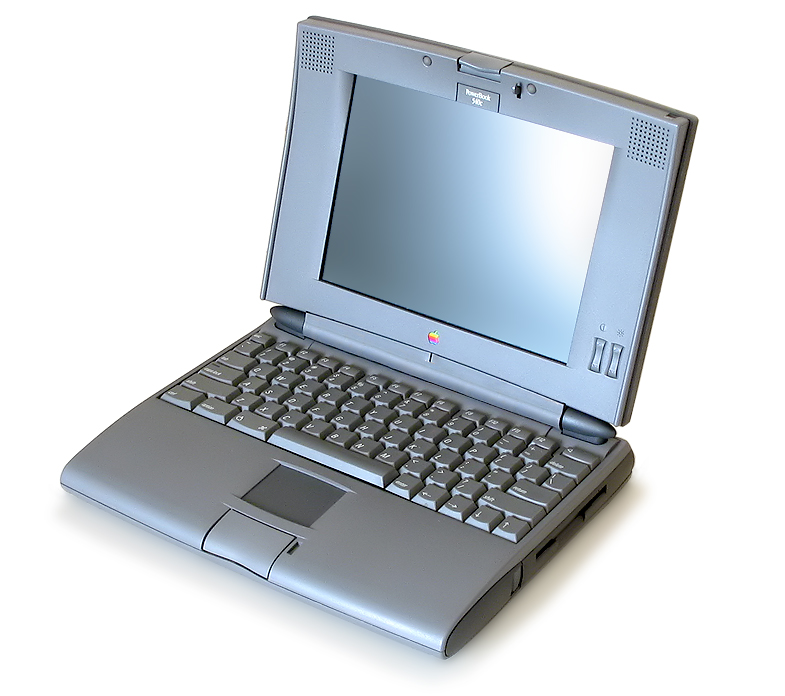
The PowerBook 540c

1994 saw the introduction of the Motorola 68LC040-based PowerBook 500 series, code-named Blackbird. These models of PowerBooks were much sleeker and faster than the 100 series, which they replaced as the mid and high-end models. The 500 series featured DSTN (520) or active-matrix LCD displays (540 and 550), stereo speakers, and was the first computer to use a trackpad (although a similar technology had been included on the pioneering Gavilan SC 11 years earlier); it was also the first portable computer to offer built-in Ethernet networking. The PowerBook 500 series was the mainstay of the product line until the PowerBook 5300. The 500 series was the first PowerBook to feature PCMCIA slots, although this was an optional feature that required the user to sacrifice one of the two available battery slots to house the PCMCIA expansion cage.

The PowerBook 500 series was released as Apple was already moving its desktop machines to the PowerPC processor range, and a future upgrade was promised from the start. This came in 1995, as an Apple Motherboard containing a 100 MHz 603e processor and 8 MB of RAM (which snapped into a slot containing the previous 25 or 33 MHz 68040 processor and the 4 MB of RAM on the previous daughterboard). At the same time Newer Technology offered an Apple-authorized 117 MHz Motherboard, which was more popular than the Apple product, and optionally came without any RAM. The company later offered 167 MHz and 183 MHz upgrades containing more memory and onboard cache memory to improve performance. Nonetheless, the internal architecture of the 500 series meant that the speed increase provided by the 100 and 117 MHz upgrades was, for most users, relatively small.

The 500 series was completely discontinued upon the introduction of its replacement the PPC-based PowerBook 5300, with the PowerBook 190 replacing the 500 as the only 68LC040 PowerBook Apple offered.

== PowerPC-based models ==
=== PowerBook x300 series ===
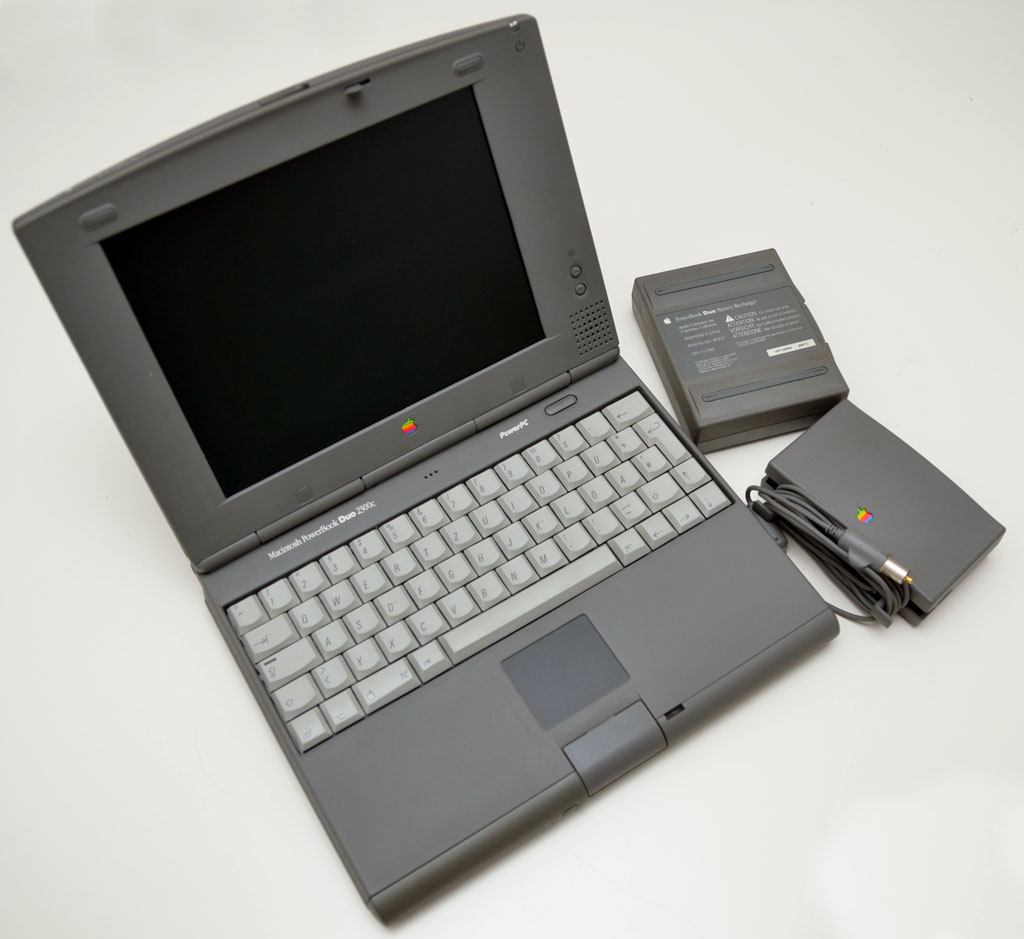
The PowerBook Duo 2300c

The PowerBook x300 series was highly anticipated as the first PowerPC-based notebook computers. Shortly after its release, the high-end PowerBook 5300 model was affected by reliability problems, including a recall of its lithium-ion batteries after testing identified a fire risk. Apple replaced the batteries with nickel-metal hydride units and offered an extended repair program.

The series also included the subcompact PowerBook Duo 2300.

=== PowerBook x400 series ===
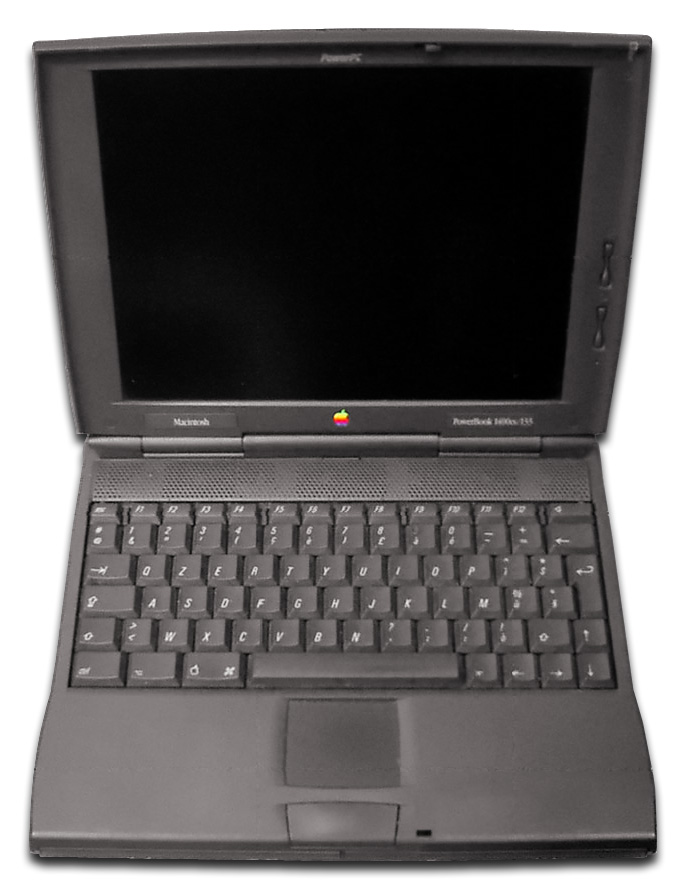
The PowerBook 1400cs

In 1996 and 1997, Apple updated the PowerBook lineup with the x400 series: the entry-level PowerBook 1400, the subcompact PowerBook 2400 (replacing the Duo series), and the high-end PowerBook 3400. The PowerBook 1400 and 3400 were the first PowerBooks to include an internal CD drive.

=== PowerBook G3 series ===
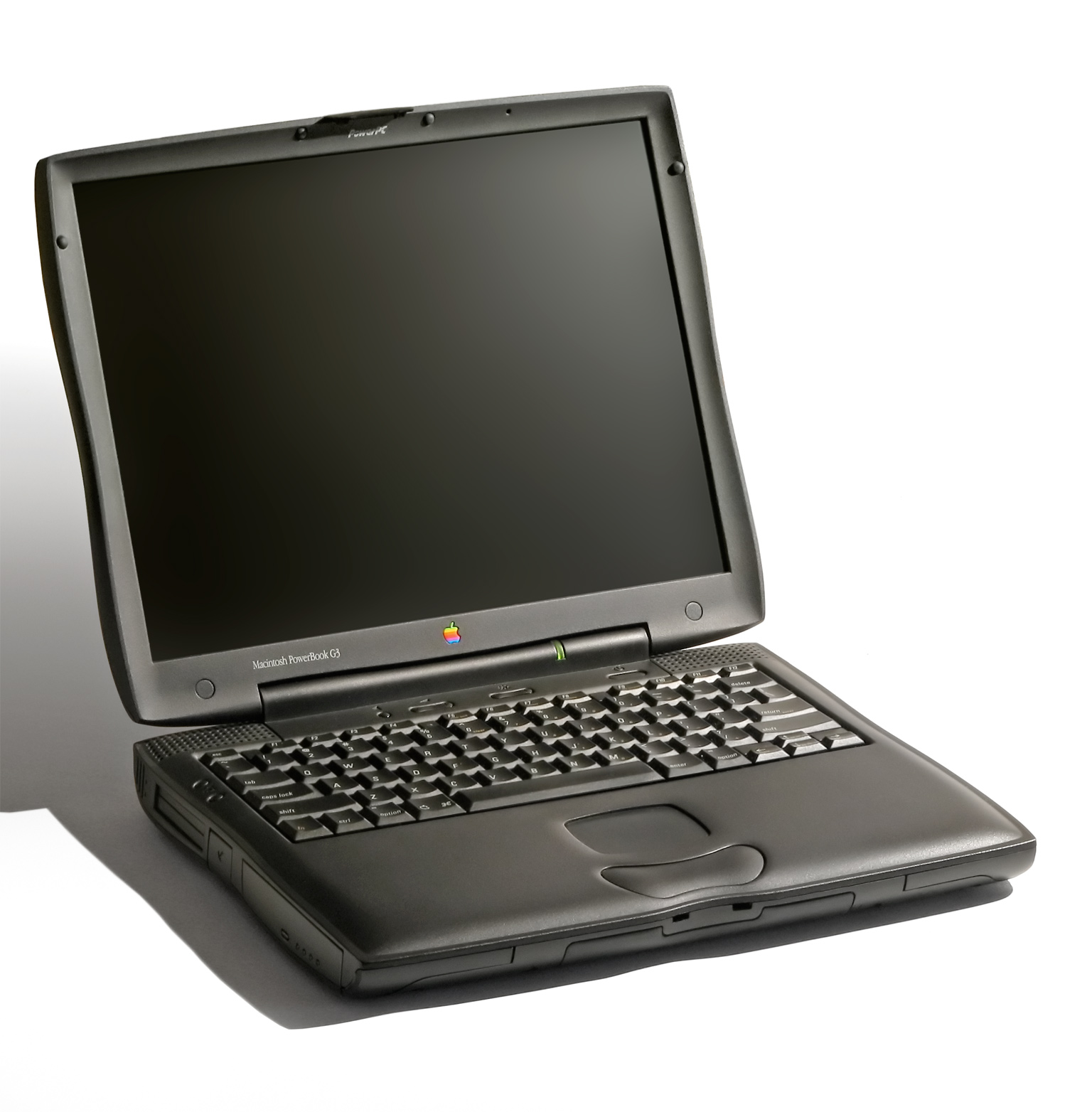
A Wallstreet Powerbook G3

Late in 1997, the PowerBook 3400 case was used to create the first PowerBook G3, codenamed Kanga. This series was the last PowerBook model to employ a "real" keyboard with 1 cm high keys; all later models have flat keys.

The first PowerBook G3 Series (completely redesigned from the Kanga) was released in 1998, although it was still an Old World ROM Mac. These new PowerBooks took design cues from the 500 series PowerBook, sporting dramatic curves and a jet-black plastic case. They were so fashionable that various G3 models became the personal computer of Carrie Bradshaw in the long-running Sex and the City television show. Debuting at roughly the same time as the G3 iMac, the "WallStreet/Mainstreet" series composed of models with varying features, such as different processing speeds (from 233 to 300 MHz) and the choice of 12-, 13-, or 14-inch screens. They all included dual drive bays capable of accommodating floppy drives, CD-ROM/DVD-ROM drives, hard drives, or even extra batteries. A second PowerBook G3 Series code-named "PDQ" was introduced later in 1998, with minor changes in configuration options, notably the inclusion of L2 cache in even the lowest-priced 233 MHz model, which helped overall performance.

Apple introduced two later G3 PowerBook models, similar in appearance (curved, black plastic case with black rubberized sections) but thinner, lighter and with revised internal systems. The "Lombard" appeared in 1999, (AKA: Bronze Keyboard) a thinner, lighter, and faster (333 or 400 MHz) PowerBook with a longer battery life and had both USB and SCSI built in and was a New World ROM Mac, and then the "Pismo" in 2000, which replaced the single SCSI port with two FireWire ports, updated the PowerBook line to AGP graphics, a 100 MHz bus speed, and DVD-ROM optical drives standard, in addition to dropping the "G3" from the PowerBook name. The Pismo revision also brought AirPort wireless networking capability (802.11b), which had debuted in Apple's iBook in July 1999. CPU upgrade cards are available for both Lombard and Pismo models.

=== PowerBook G4 ===
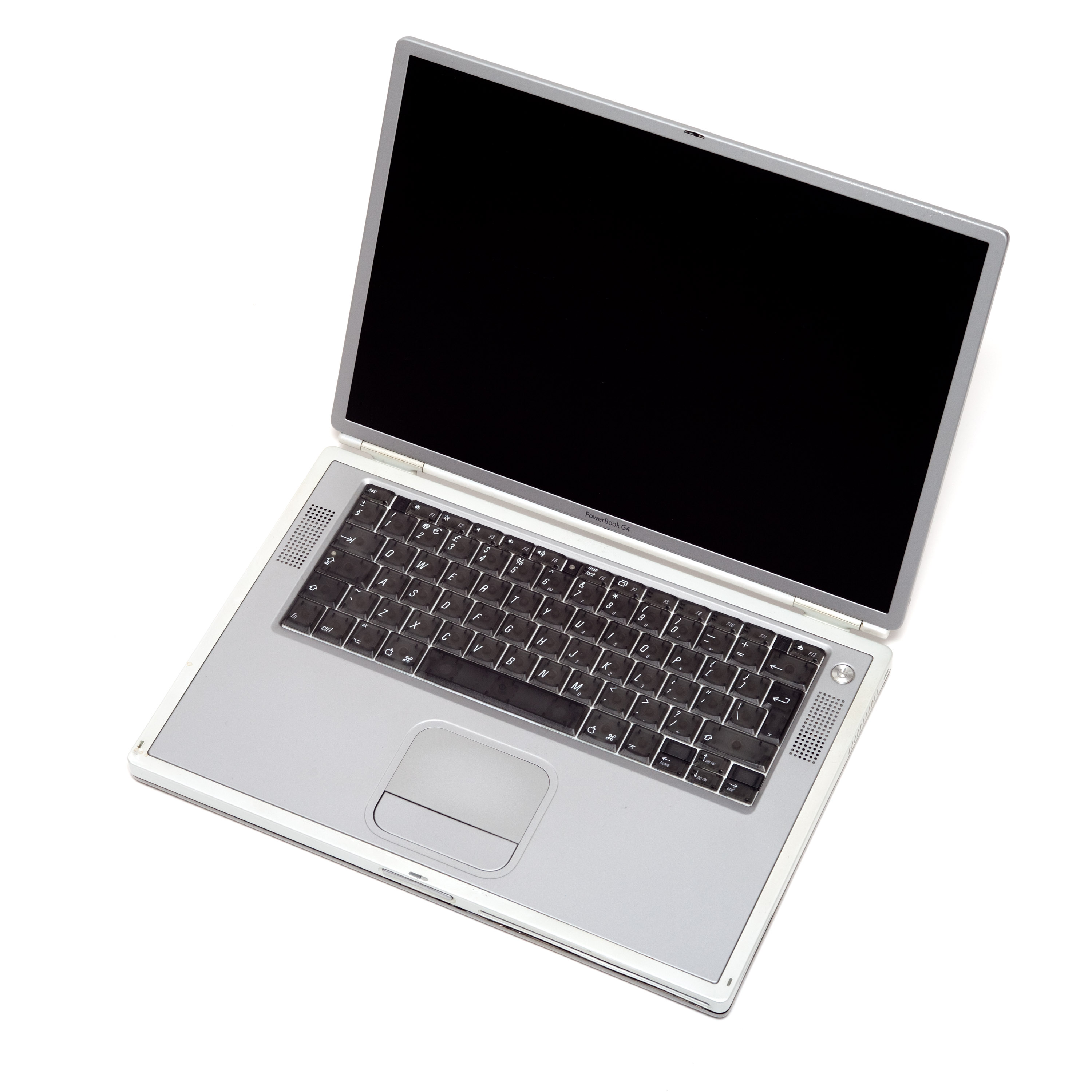
Late-model Titanium PowerBook G4 "TiBook"

Interim CEO Steve Jobs turned his eye to the redesign of the PowerBook series in 2000. The result, introduced in January 2001, was a completely re-designed New World PowerBook with a titanium skin and a 15.2-inch wide-aspect screen suitable for watching widescreen movies. Built with the PowerPC G4 processor, it was billed as "the first supercomputer you can actually take with you on an airplane." It was lighter than most PC based laptops, and due to the low power consumption of the PowerPC it outlasted them by hours.

The TiBooks, as they were nicknamed, became a fashion item. They were especially popular in the entertainment business, where they adorned many desks in Hollywood motion pictures. Because of their large screens and high performance, Titanium Powerbooks were the first laptops to be widely deployed as desktop replacement computers.

The industrial design of the notebooks quickly became a standard that others in the industry would follow, creating a new wave of wide-screened notebook computers.

The Titanium PowerBooks were released in configurations of 400 MHz, 500 MHz, 550 MHz, 667 MHz, 800 MHz, 867 MHz, and 1 GHz. They are the last PowerBooks able to boot Mac OS 9 natively.

In 2003, Apple Computer launched both the largest-screen laptop in the world and Apple's smallest full-featured notebook computer. Both machines were made of anodized aluminum (coining the new nickname AlBook), featured DVD-burning capabilities, AirPort Extreme networking, Bluetooth, and 12.1-inch or 17-inch LCD displays. The 17-inch model included a fiber optic-illuminated keyboard, which eventually became standard on all 15-inch and 17-inch PowerBooks. Two ambient light sensors, located under each speaker grille, adjusted the brightness of the backlit keyboard and the display according to the light level.

The 12-inch PowerBook's screen did not use the same panel as that used on the 12-inch iBook, while the 17-inch PowerBook used the same screen as that used on the 17-inch flat-panel iMac, but with a thinner backlight.

Later in 2003, the 15-inch PowerBooks were redesigned and featured the same aluminum body style as their smaller and larger siblings, and with the same feature set as the 17-inch model (including the backlit keyboard). This basic design would carry through the transition to the Intel-based MacBook Pro, lasting until late 2008.

In April 2004, the aluminum PowerBooks were upgraded. The SuperDrive was upgraded to 4× burning speed for DVDs, the fastest processor available was upgraded to 1.5 GHz, and the graphics cards were replaced with newer models, offering up to 128 MB of video memory. A third built-in speaker was added to the 12-inch model for improved midrange sound. In addition, AirPort Extreme cards became standard for all PowerBooks instead of being offered as an add-on option.

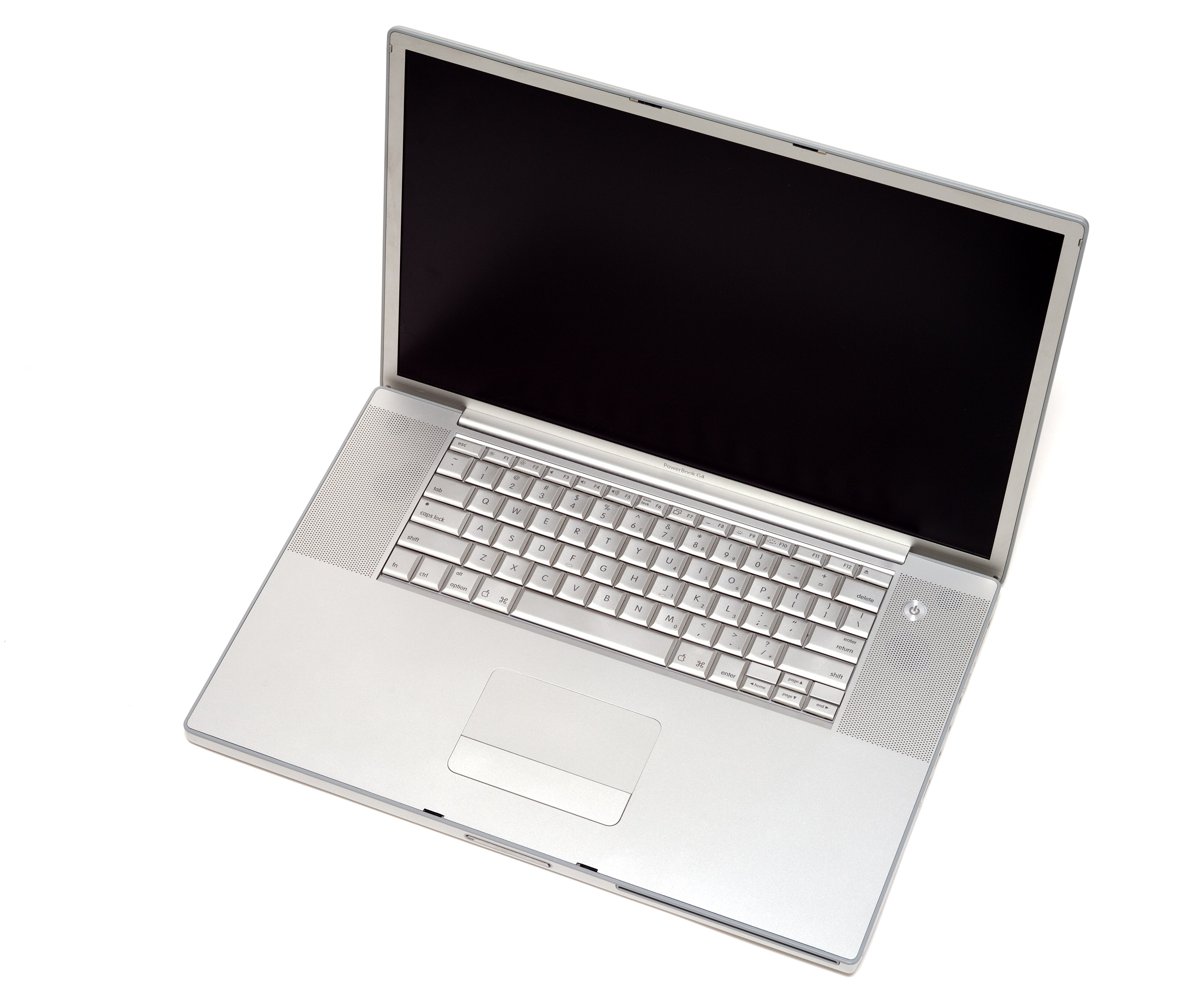
One of the final, 1.67 GHz 17" PowerBooks

In January 2005, the specifications of the aluminum PowerBooks were revised once more to accompany a price decrease. Processor speeds were increased to a maximum of 1.67 GHz on the higher specification 15-inch and all 17-inch versions, while the lower specification 15-inch model and the 12-inch unit saw an increase in speed to 1.5 GHz. Optical audio output was added to the 17-inch version. Memory and hard drive defaults were increased to 512 MB and 5400 rpm, respectively, with a new storage maximum of 100 GB on the 17-inch model. Each model also received an enhanced trackpad with scrolling capabilities, a revised Bluetooth module supporting BT 2.0+EDR, and a new feature that parks the drive heads when sudden motion is detected by an internal sensor. Support for the 30-inch Apple Cinema display was also introduced in the new 17-inch model and was optional in the 15-inch model via a build-to-order upgrade to the computer's video hardware. The SuperDrive now included DVD+R capability.

In October 2005, the two higher-end PowerBooks were upgraded once again, with higher-resolution displays (1440 × 960 pixels on the 15-inch model, and 1680 × 1050 pixels on the 17-inch model) and faster 533 MHz DDR2 (PC2-4200) memory. The SuperDrive became standard equipment and included support for dual-layer DVDs on the 15- and 17-inch models. The 17-inch model was updated with a 120 GB standard hard drive, as well as a 7200 rpm, 100 GB build-to-order option. These drives were also options on the 15-inch PowerBook. The 12-inch model with SuperDrive remained unchanged in this respect, although each new PowerBook boasted a longer battery life.

==== Battery recall ====
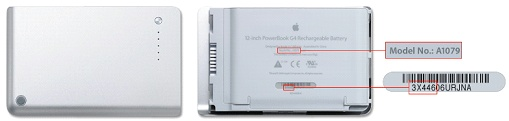
Model and serial number location on PowerBook battery

On May 20, 2005, Apple and the Consumer Product Safety Commission announced the recall of some Apple PowerBook G4 batteries. These batteries were manufactured by Sony; Dell, Toshiba, Lenovo, HP, Fujitsu and Acer laptops were also affected by the defective batteries. The joint Apple/CPSC press release stated that an internal short could cause the battery cells to overheat, posing a fire hazard. Approximately 128,000 defective units were sold. Though the problems first appeared to be solved, they continued for many users. In early August 2006, Engadget reported that a PowerBook had "violently exploded" because of faulty battery. On August 24, 2006, Apple and the CPSC announced an additional recall of more batteries for the same PowerBook models. About 1.1 million battery packs in the United States were recalled; an additional 700,000 were sold outside the U.S.

== Discontinuation ==
At the 2006 Macworld Conference & Expo, the MacBook Pro was introduced. The new notebooks, however, only came in 15.4-inch models and the 12-inch and 17-inch PowerBooks remained available for sale at Apple stores and retailers, as well as the 15-inch model, which was sold until supplies ran out. On April 24, 2006, the 17-inch PowerBook G4 was replaced by a 17-inch MacBook Pro variant. The 12-inch PowerBook G4 remained available until May 16, 2006, when the MacBook was introduced as a replacement for the iBook. Because of its availability in highly powerful configurations, it was also considered a replacement for the 12-inch PowerBook, ending the nearly 15-year production of PowerBook-branded computers. An indirect successor, the 13-inch MacBook Pro, was introduced in mid 2009.

== Timeline ==
Timeline of portable Macintoshes
See also: List of Mac models

== Legacy ==
Traditionally, the portable line trailed the desktops in the utilization of the latest processors, with the notable exception of the PowerBook G3, which was released simultaneously with the desktop Power Macintosh G3. PowerBooks would continue to trail behind the desktop Macs, however, never even adopting the G5 processor. This was due primarily to the extreme heat caused by most of the full-sized processors available and unacceptable power consumption.

With the introduction of the Intel-based Macs, once again, the MacBook Pro joined the iMac in sharing the new technology simultaneously.

== See also ==
- IBM RS/6000 laptops and IBM ThinkPad 800 series — another range of laptops based on PowerPC CPUs.
- iBook
- MacBook
