= Newer Technology =

Newer Technology is an American technology company headquartered in Woodstock, Illinois, that designs and manufactures accessories primarily for Apple, Inc. products.

== History ==
Founded in 1988 Newer Technology initially focused on manufacturing computer upgrades and accessories such as processor cards, CPU caches, memory, and PowerBook batteries. At its peak in the mid-1990s the company was known in Apple Macintosh communities for its end-of-life extending upgrades. This included user-installable MAXpowr CPU cards that could upgrade an obsolete Macintosh computer across architectures, such as from Motorola 68000 to PowerPC thereby extending the usable life of the computer by years.

NewerTech filed for Chapter 11 bankruptcy in June 1996 due to a rapidly declining Apple Macintosh market and sharp decrease in memory prices. An effort to diversify revenue by developing Windows products was announced, but by the end of 2000 the company was dissolved. The name and remaining intellectual property were purchased in 2001 by Rick Estes, NewerTech's former Vice President of Operations.

In 2002 their name and products were acquired by Other World Computing and now do business as "NewerTech an OWC brand". As of 2019 they continue to supply Macintosh, iPad, and iPhone accessories.
