= Enerdel =

United States energy storage device company

EnerDel
- Company type: Private
- Traded as: Formerly Nasdaq: HEV
- Founded: 2004
- Defunct: 2022
- Fate: Bankruptcy and acquired
- Headquarters: Greenfield, United States
- Products: Lithium-ion powered battery solutions
- Owner: Paul Herbert
- Number of employees: 80 (2017)
- Parent: Ener1 Inc
- Website: www.enerdel.com

Enerdel was an American company that developed energy storage technology based on building compact lithium-ion-powered batteries for the transportation, utility grid and industrial electronics markets.

The company was headquartered in Greenfield, Indianapolis, Indiana, and had manufacturing locations in the United States and Korea. Enerdel also develops commercial fuel cell products and nanotechnology-based materials.

The company had been listed on the Nasdaq through it parent holding company Ener1 until it filed for bankruptcy protection in 2012. The company was acquired by a private investor, Paul Herbert, through his company PLH Energy in 2022. Herbert had been a Director of EnerDel for a number of years prior to the acquisition and had been part of refocusing the business onto bespoke energy storage.

== History ==
Enerdel was founded in 2004 to focus on electrical batteries for heavy-duty transportation, and on and off-grid electrical storage.

Ener1 filed for Chapter 11 bankruptcy protection on January 26, 2012. It completed restructuring of its debt and emerged from bankruptcy on March 30, 2012.

Ener1 received a $118.5 million grant from the Department of Energy in 2010 via the American Recovery and Reinvestment Act of 2009. The company traded on the over the counter market under the symbol HEV. It was de-listed from the NASDAQ Stock Market on October 28, 2011 prior to its January 2012 bankruptcy filing.

The remains of the company was acquired by its former director Paul Herbert, through his company PLH Energy in 2022. In July 2023, Enerdel filed for Chapter 7 bankruptcy liquidation after laying off most of its staff.
