= List of Mac models =

This is a list of all major types of Mac computers produced by Apple Inc. in order of introduction date. Macintosh Performa models were often physically identical to other models, in which case they are omitted in favor of the identical twin. Also not listed are model numbers that identify software bundles. For example, the Performa 6115CD and 6116CD differed only in software and were identical to the Power Macintosh 6100, so only the 6100 is listed below. The Apple Network Server and Apple Lisa are included, as they filled high-end niches of the Macintosh line despite not directly running macOS.

== Timeline ==
Complete timeline of Macintosh models

== Detailed timeline ==
=== 1980s ===
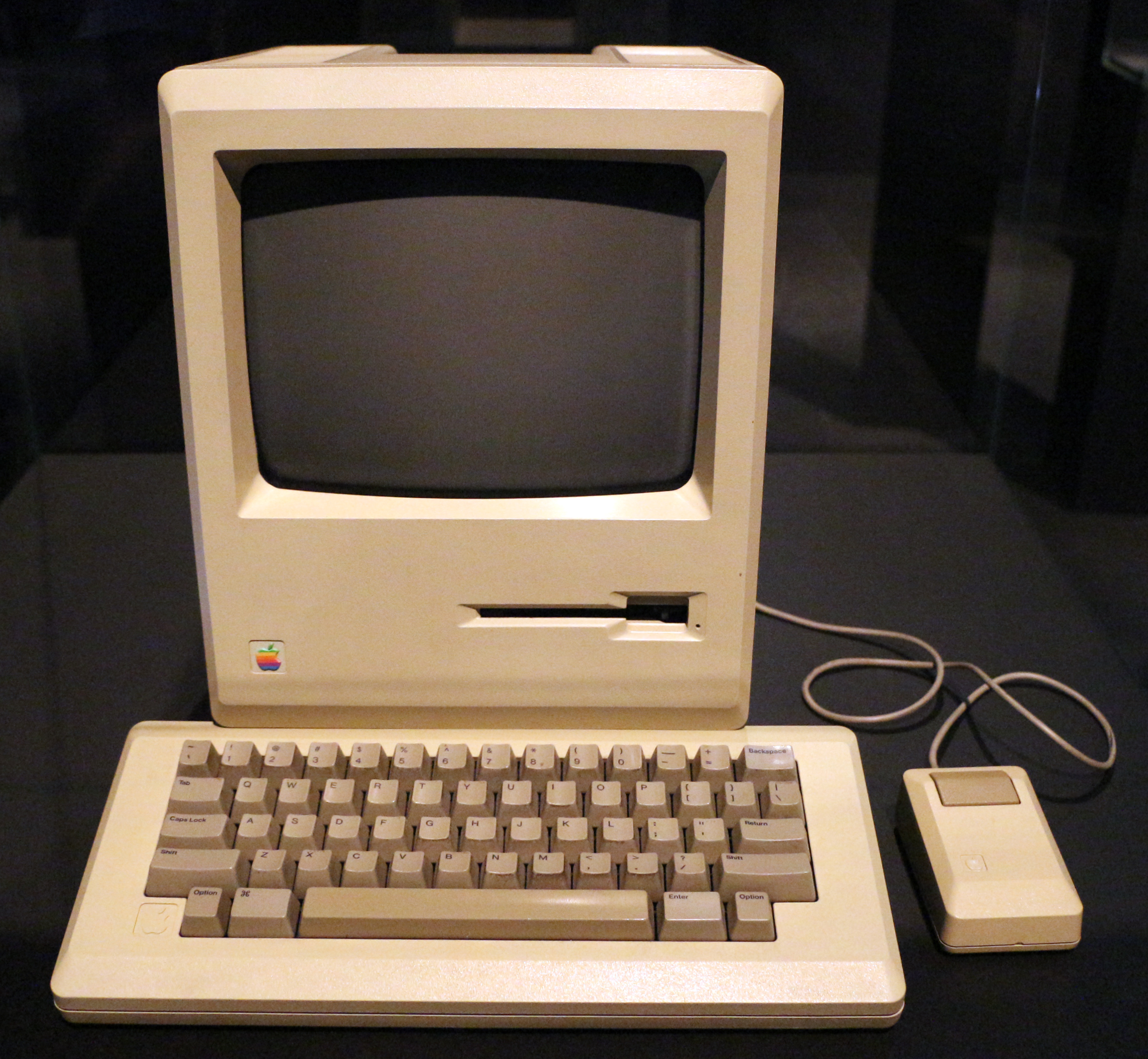
Macintosh 128K, launched January 24, 1984

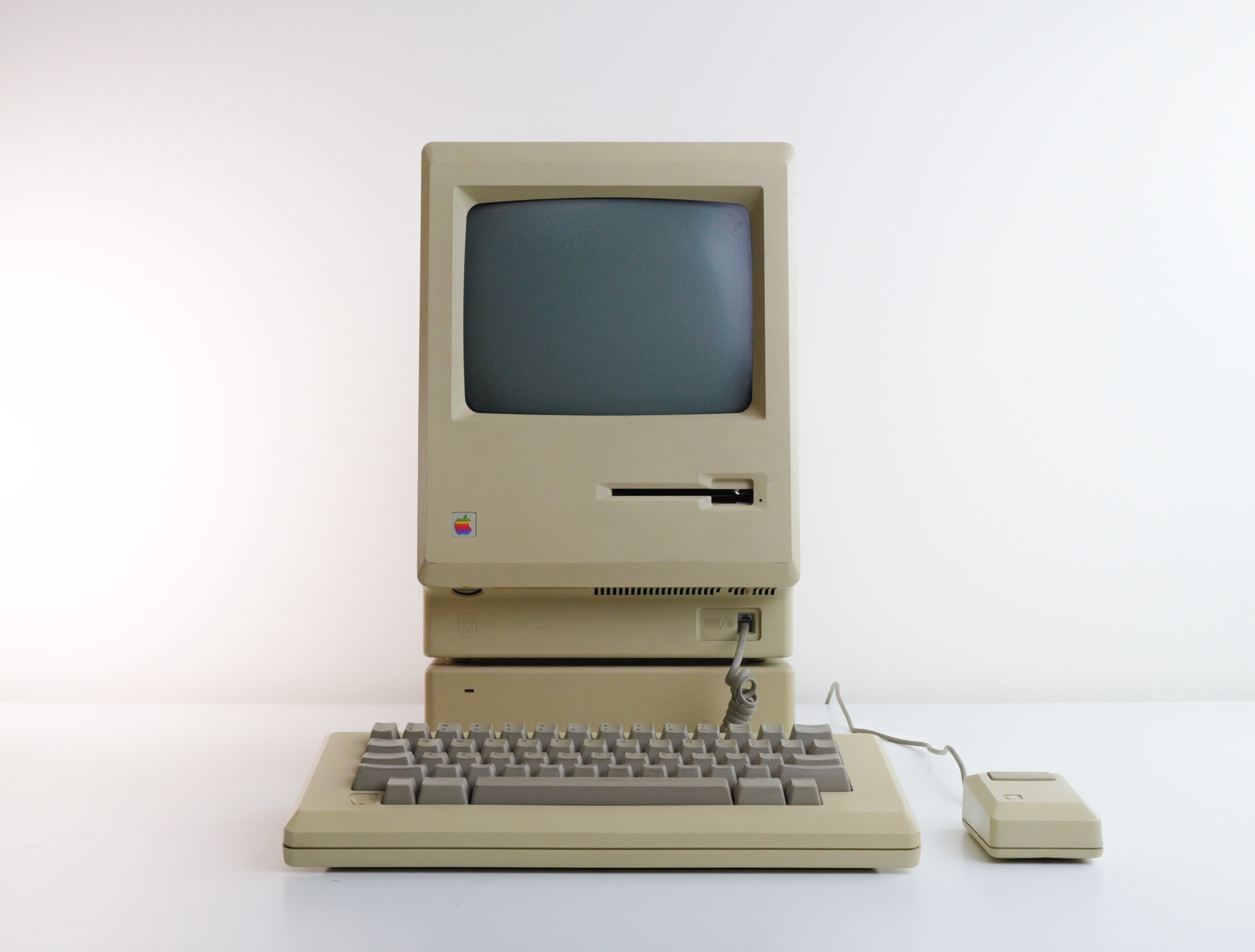
Macintosh 512K, launched September 10, 1984

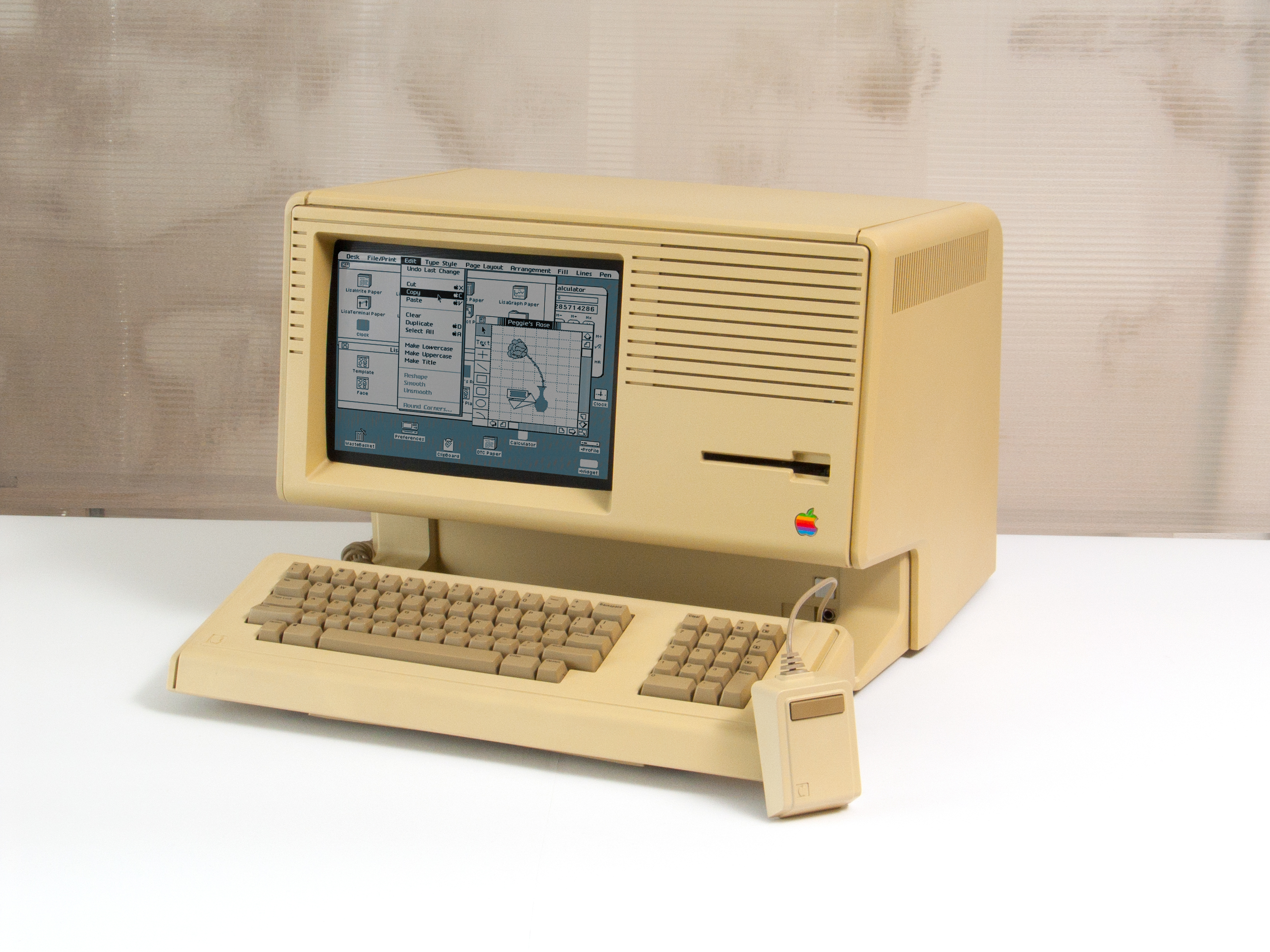
Macintosh XL, launched January 1, 1985

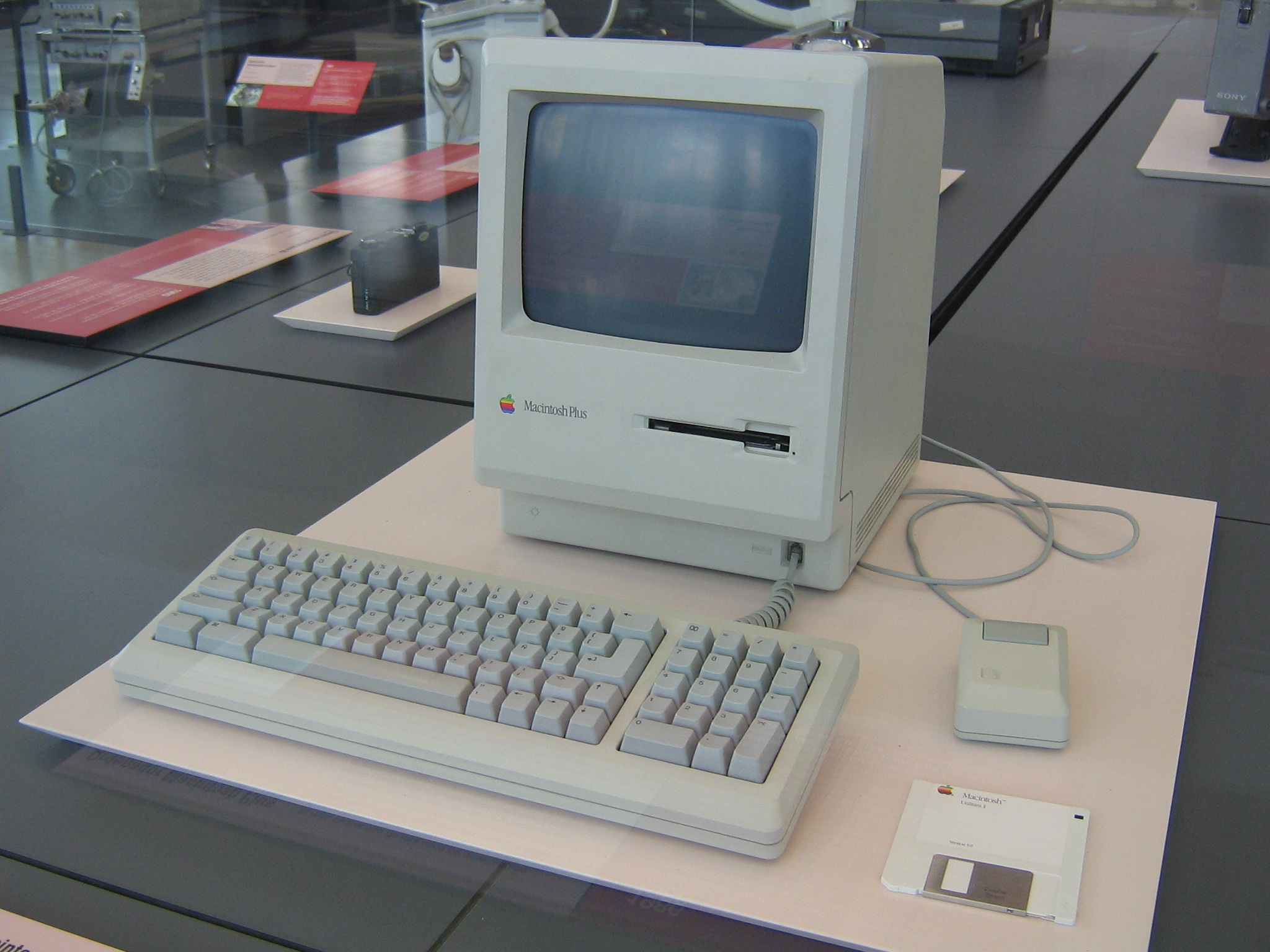
Macintosh Plus, launched January 16, 1986

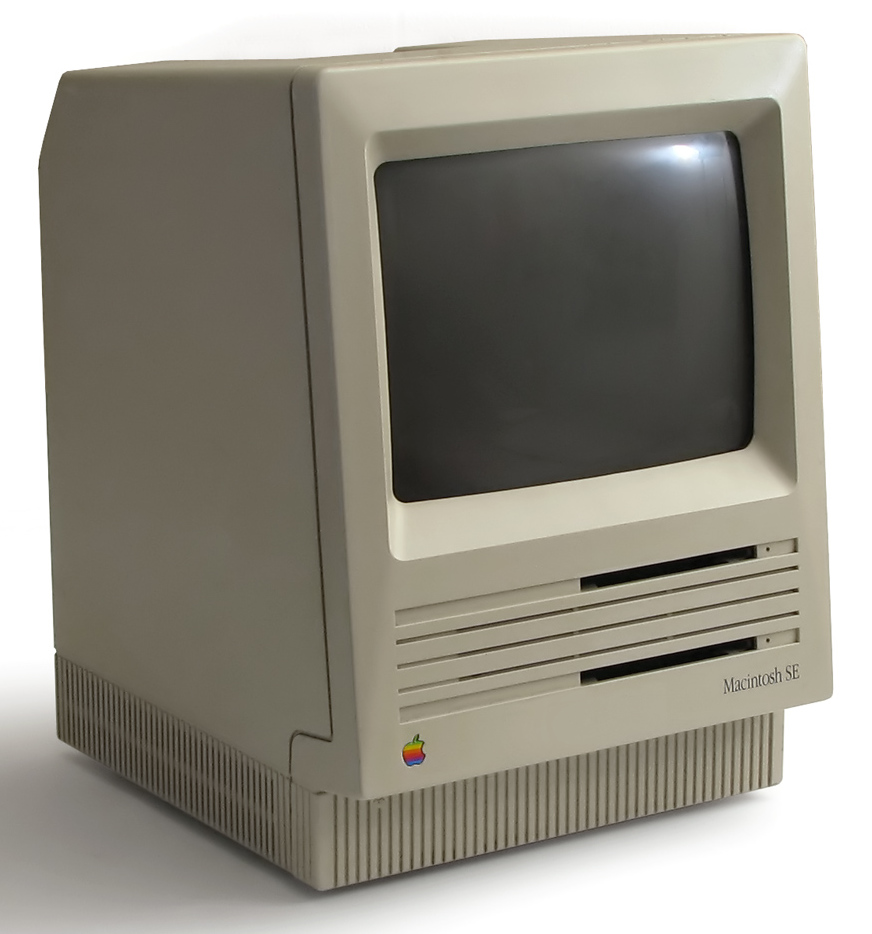
Macintosh SE, launched February 3, 1987

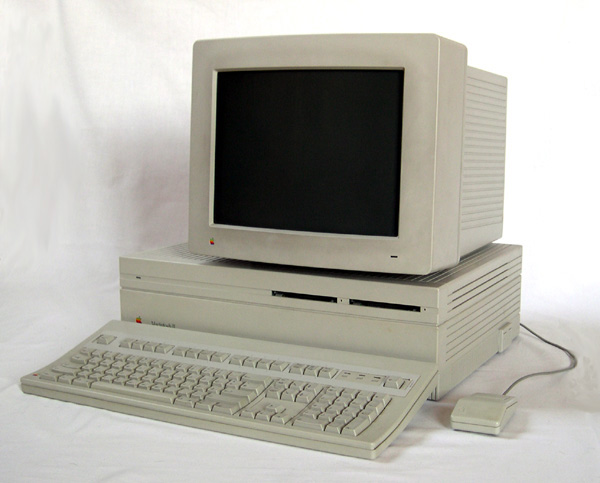
Macintosh II, launched March 2, 1987

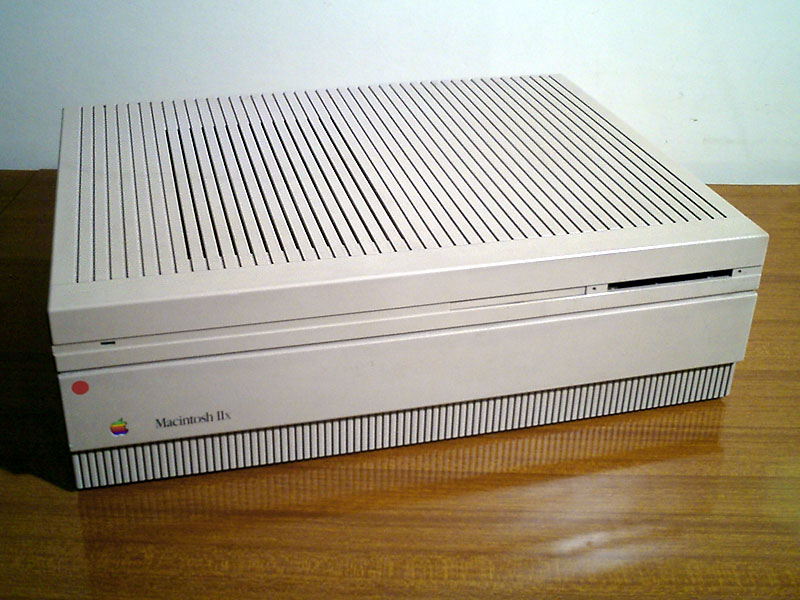
Macintosh IIx, launched September 19, 1988

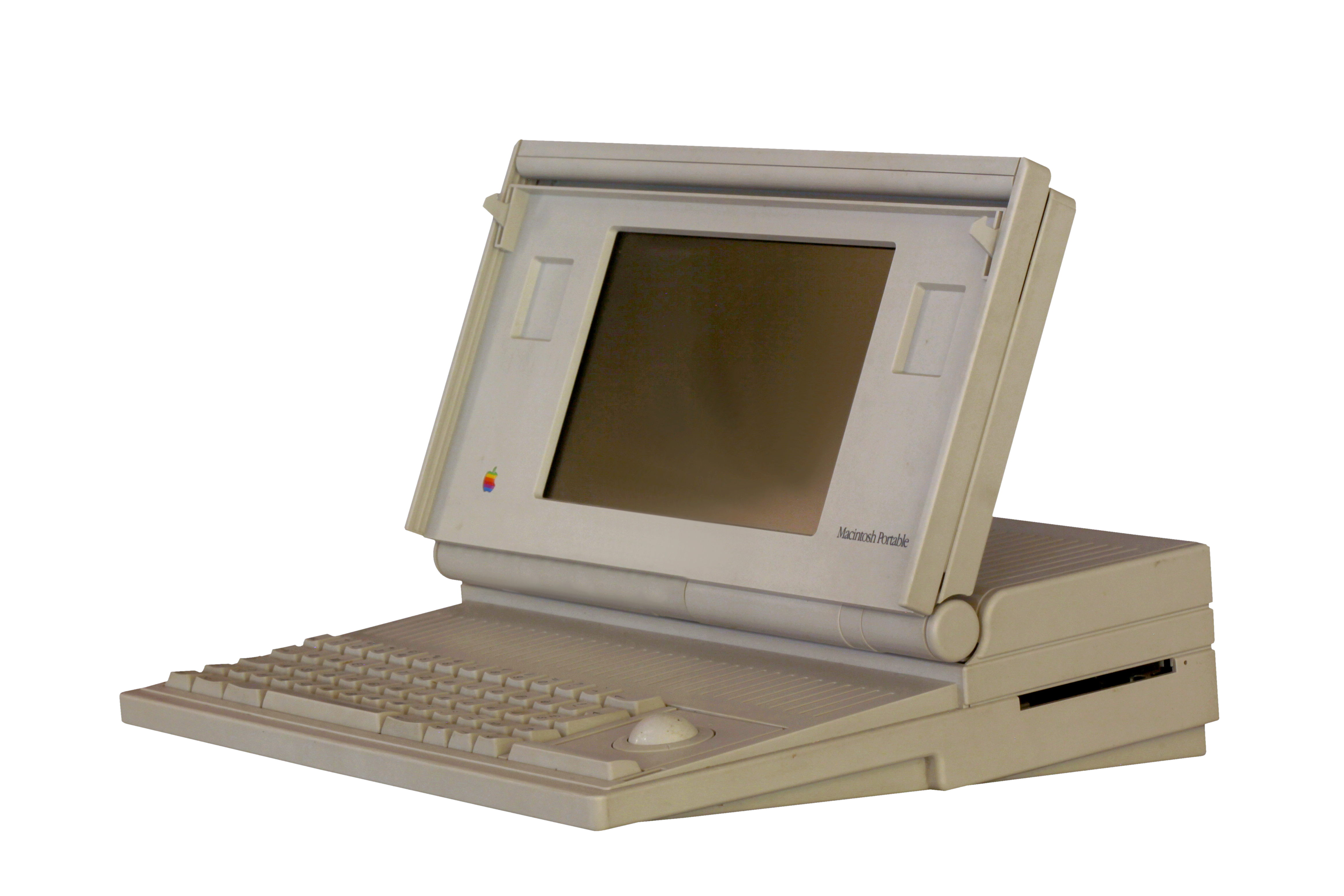
Macintosh Portable, launched September 20, 1989

Year	Launched	Model	Family	Discontinued
1983	January 19, 1983	Lisa (Note: Not a Macintosh, but included here for comparison and completeness.)	Compact	August 1, 1986
1984	January 1, 1984	Lisa 2	Compact	January 1, 1985
1984	January 24, 1984	Macintosh 128K	Compact	September 10, 1984
1984	September 10, 1984	Macintosh 512K	Compact	April 14, 1986
1984	September 10, 1984	Macintosh 128K (revised)	Compact	October 1, 1985
1985	January 1, 1985	Macintosh XL	Compact	April 29, 1985
1986	January 16, 1986	Macintosh Plus	Compact	January 1, 1987
1986	April 14, 1986	Macintosh 512Ke	Compact	October 1, 1987
1987	January 1, 1987	Macintosh Plus (Platinum)	Compact	October 15, 1990
1987	February 3, 1987	Macintosh SE	Compact	August 1, 1989
1987	March 2, 1987	Macintosh II	Mac II	January 15, 1990
1988	September 19, 1988	Macintosh IIx	Mac II	October 15, 1990
1989	January 19, 1989	Macintosh SE/30	Compact	October 21, 1991
1989	March 7, 1989	Macintosh IIcx	Mac II	March 11, 1991
1989	August 1, 1989	Macintosh SE FDHD	Compact	October 15, 1990
1989	September 20, 1989	Macintosh IIci	Mac II	February 20, 1993
1989	September 20, 1989	Macintosh Portable	Portable	February 11, 1991

=== 1990s ===
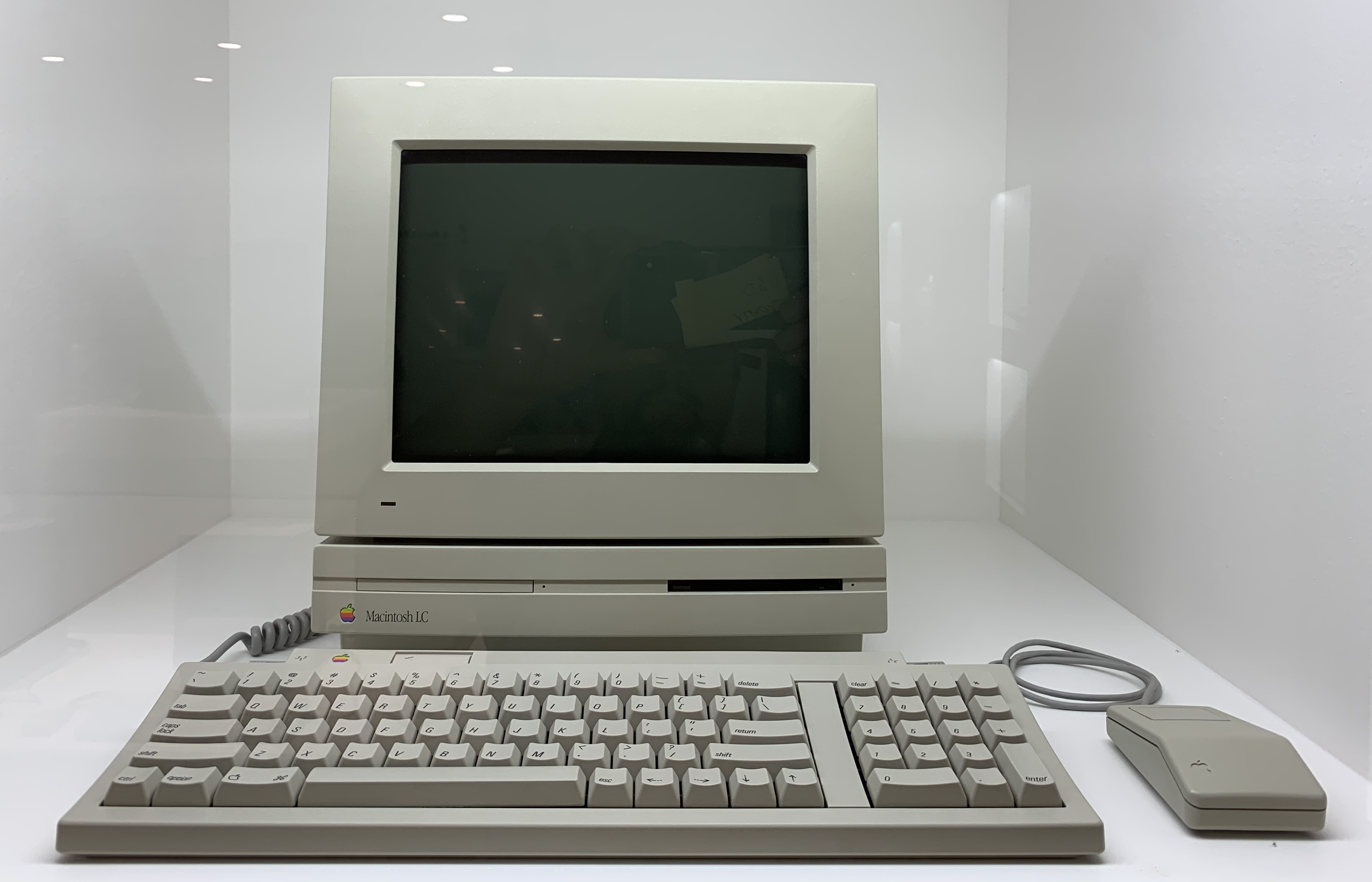
Macintosh LC, launched October 15, 1990

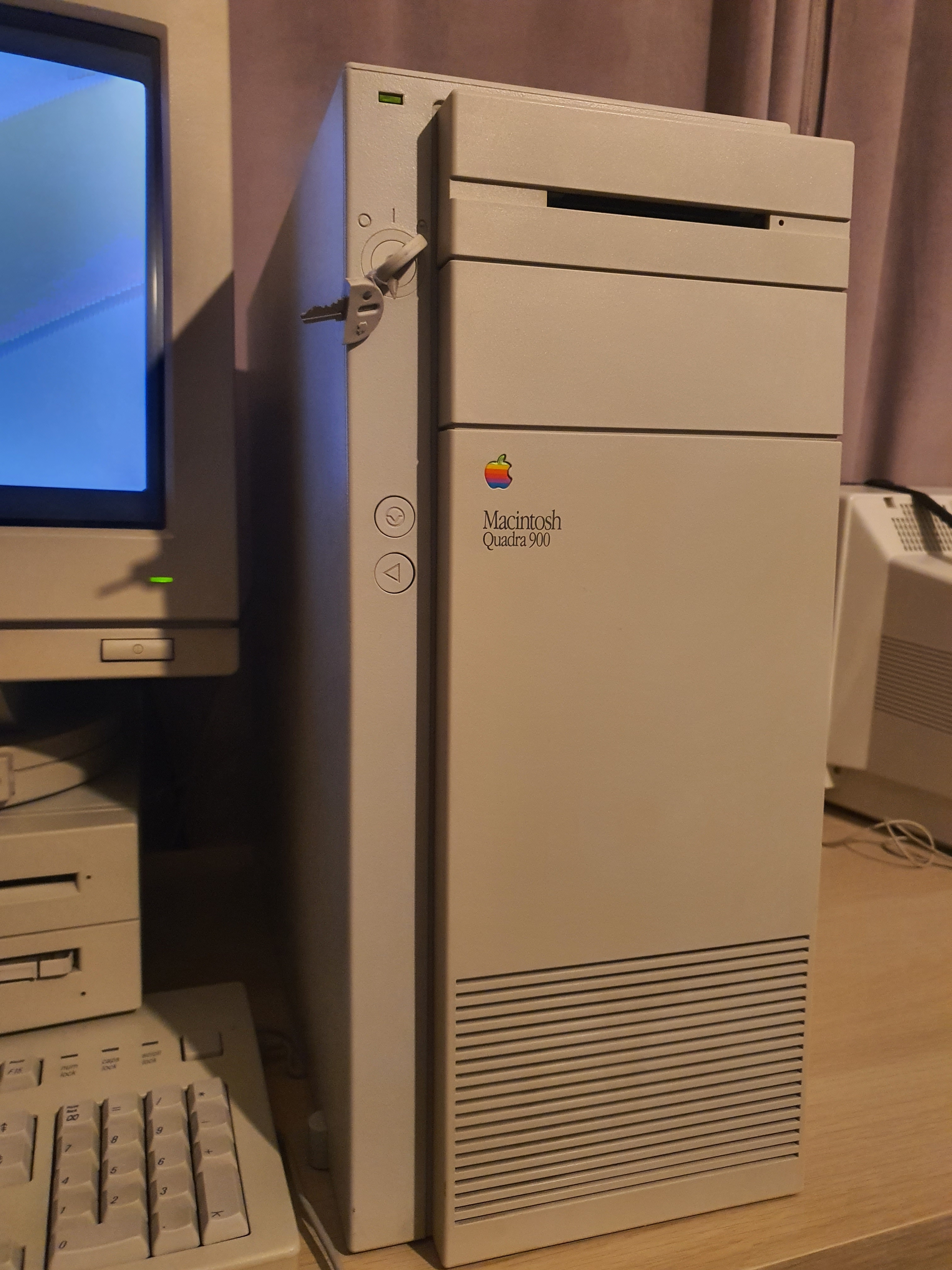
Macintosh Quadra 900, launched October 21, 1991

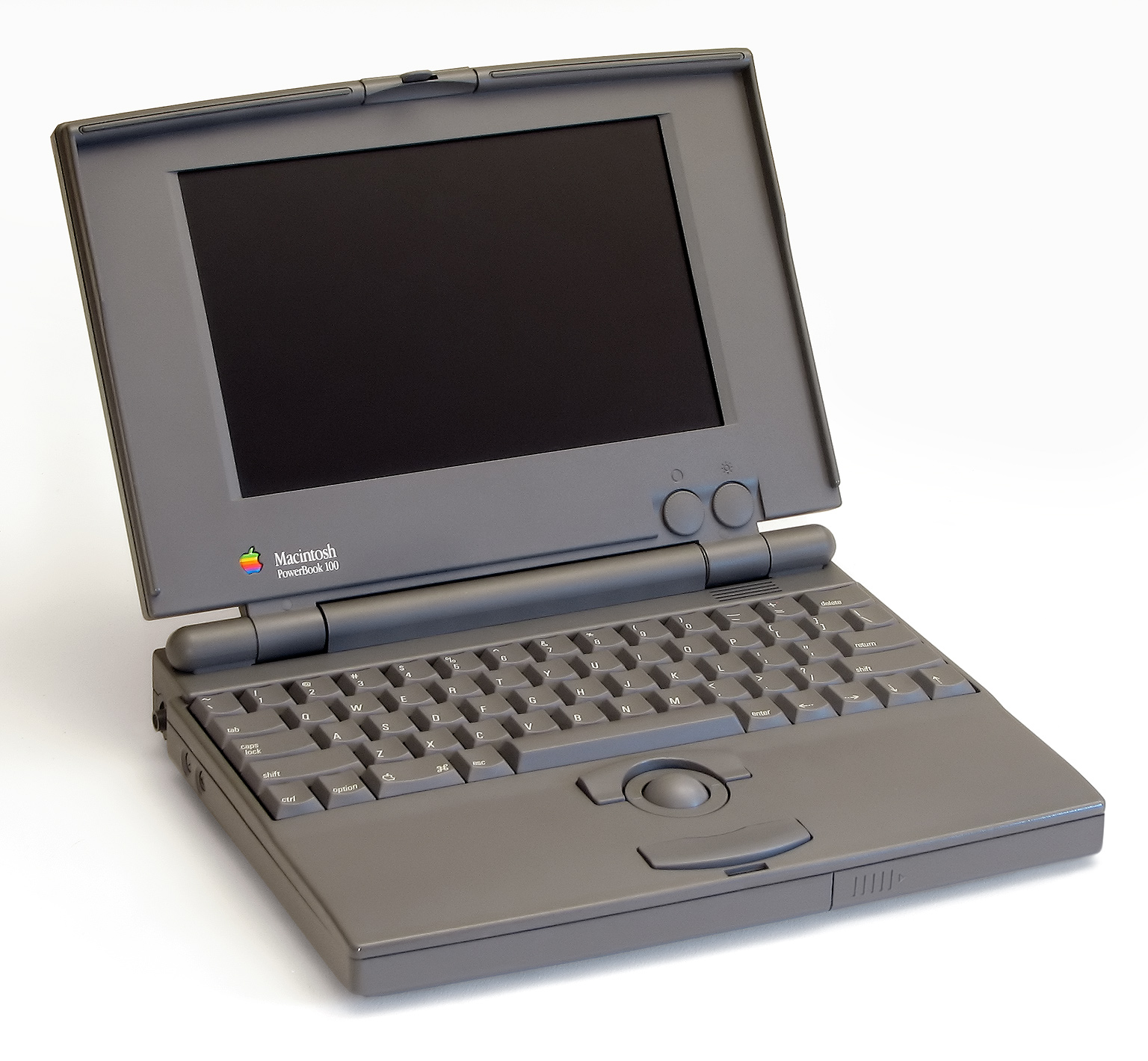
PowerBook 100, launched October 21, 1991

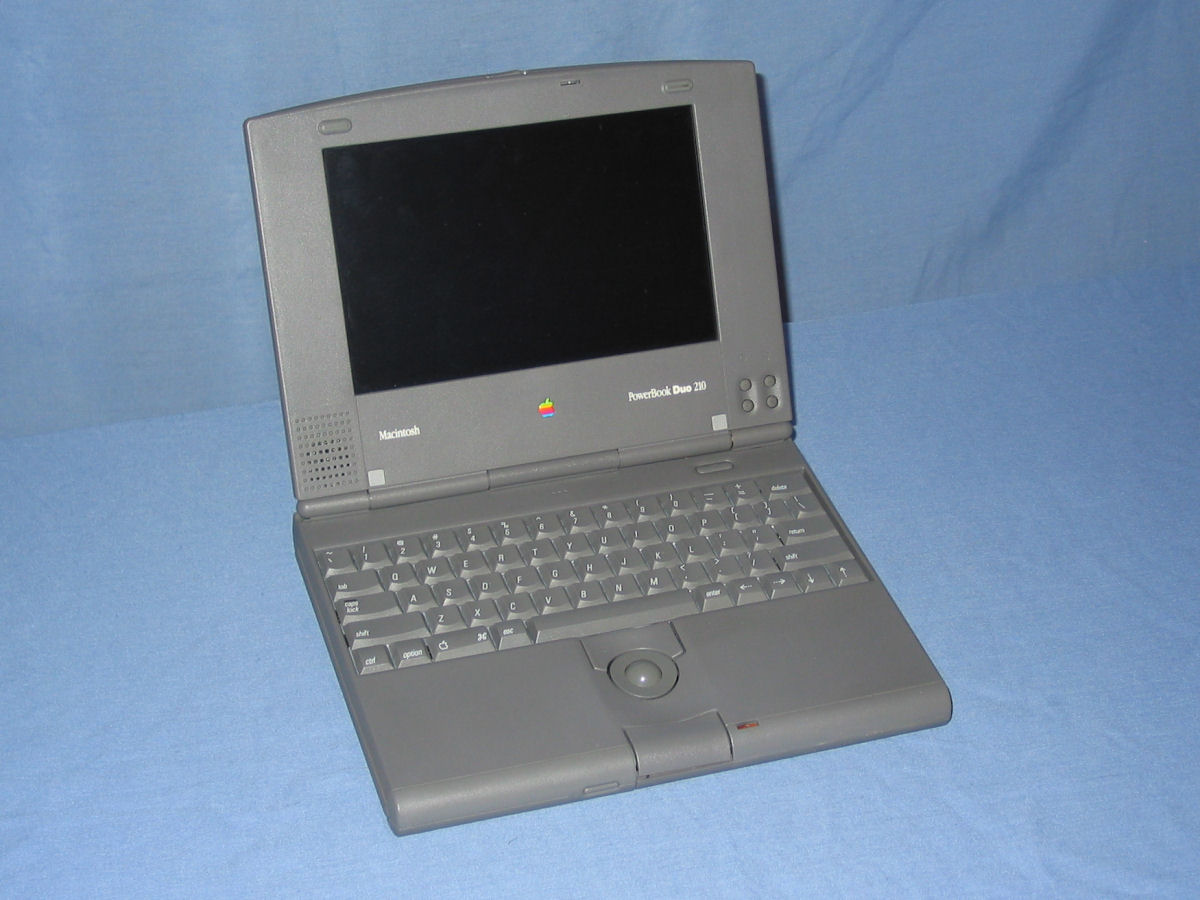
PowerBook Duo line (Duo 210 shown, launched October 19, 1992

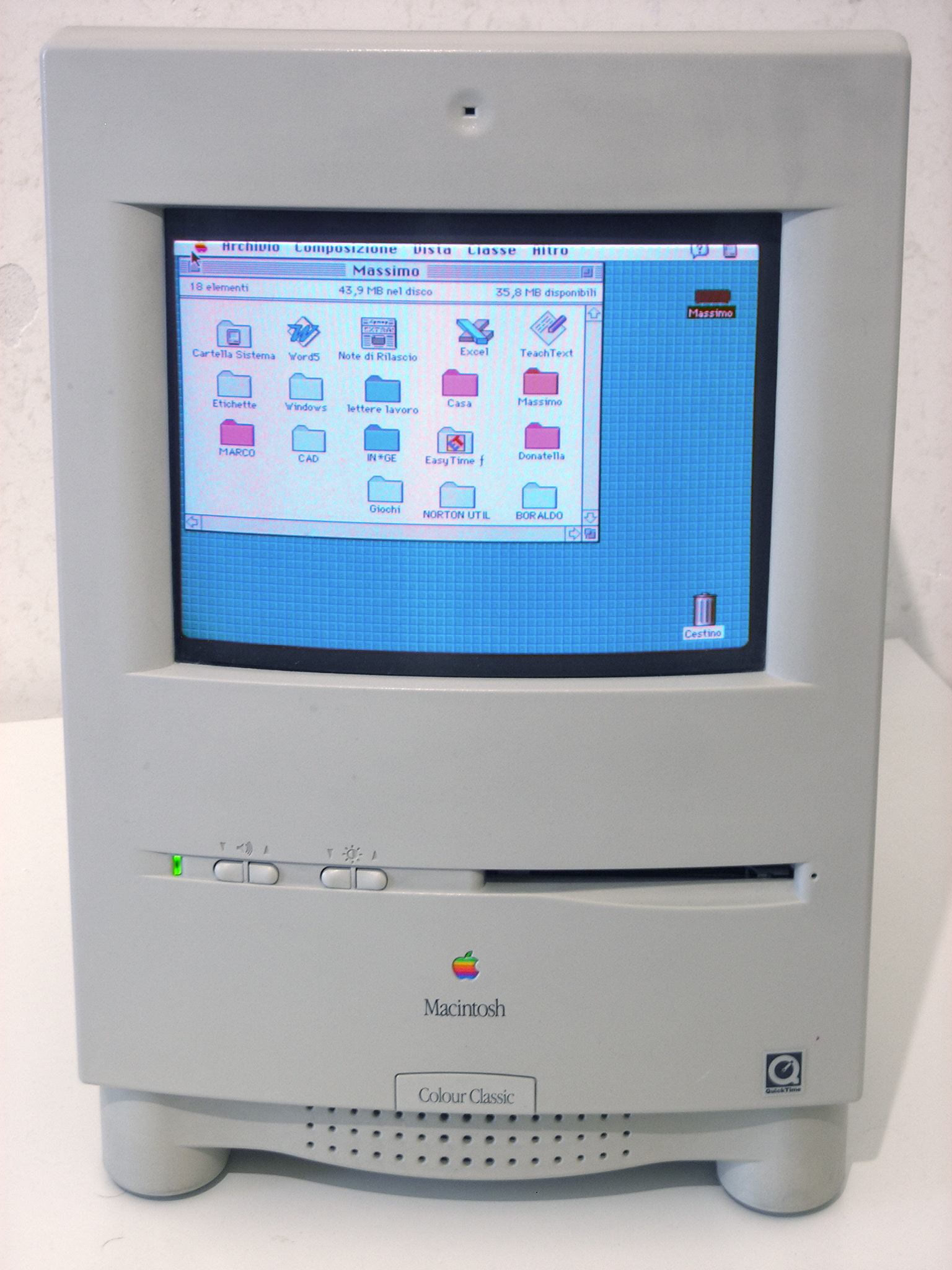
Macintosh Color Classic, launched February 10, 1993

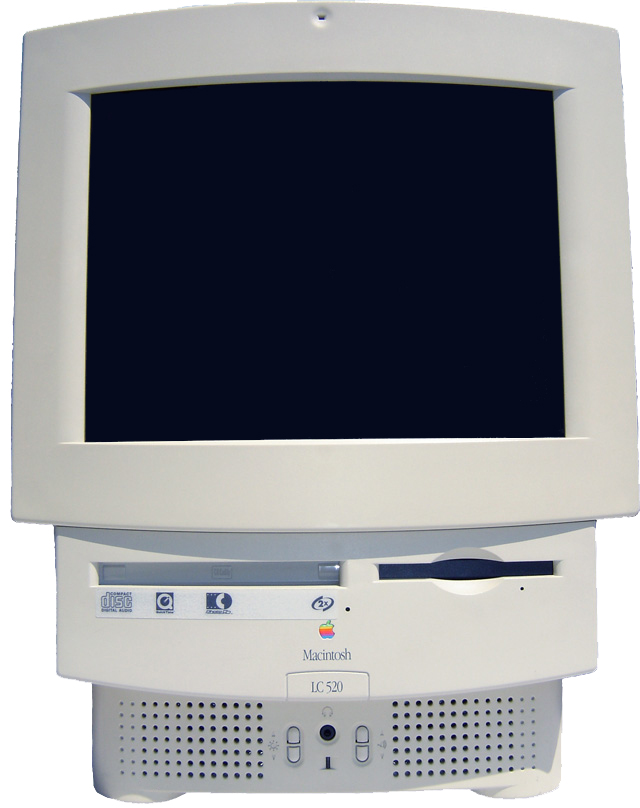
Macintosh LC 500 series (LC 520 shown), launched June 28, 1993

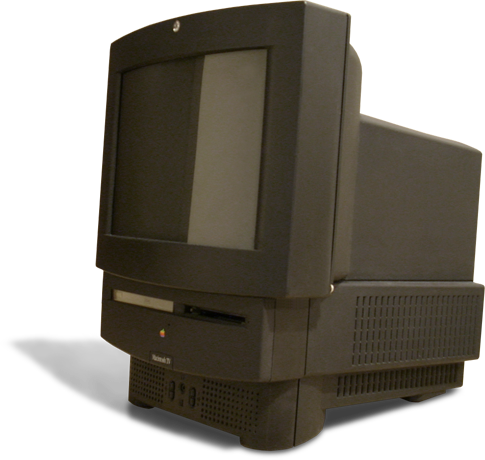
Macintosh TV, launched October 25, 1993

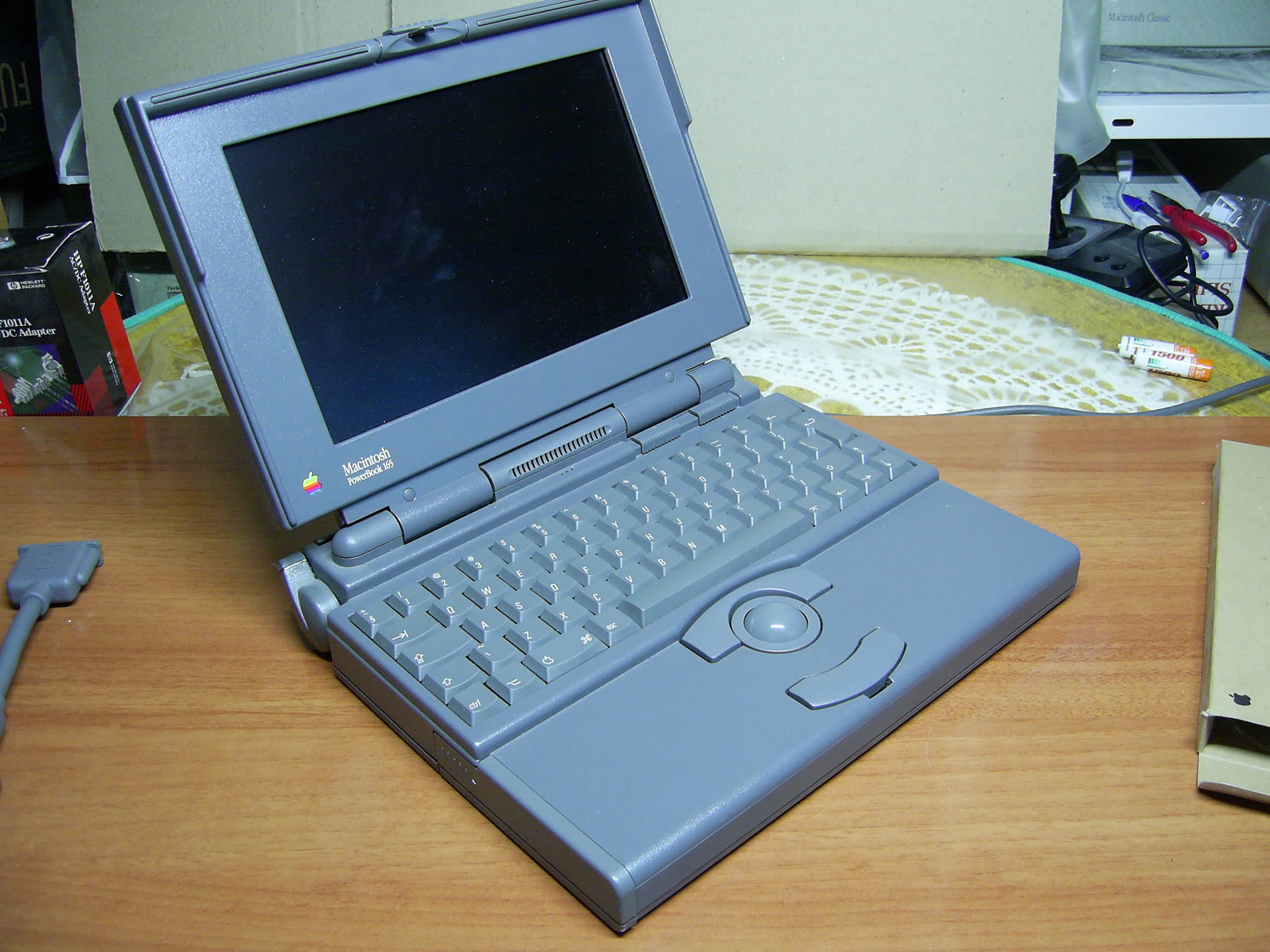
PowerBook 165, launched December 13, 1993

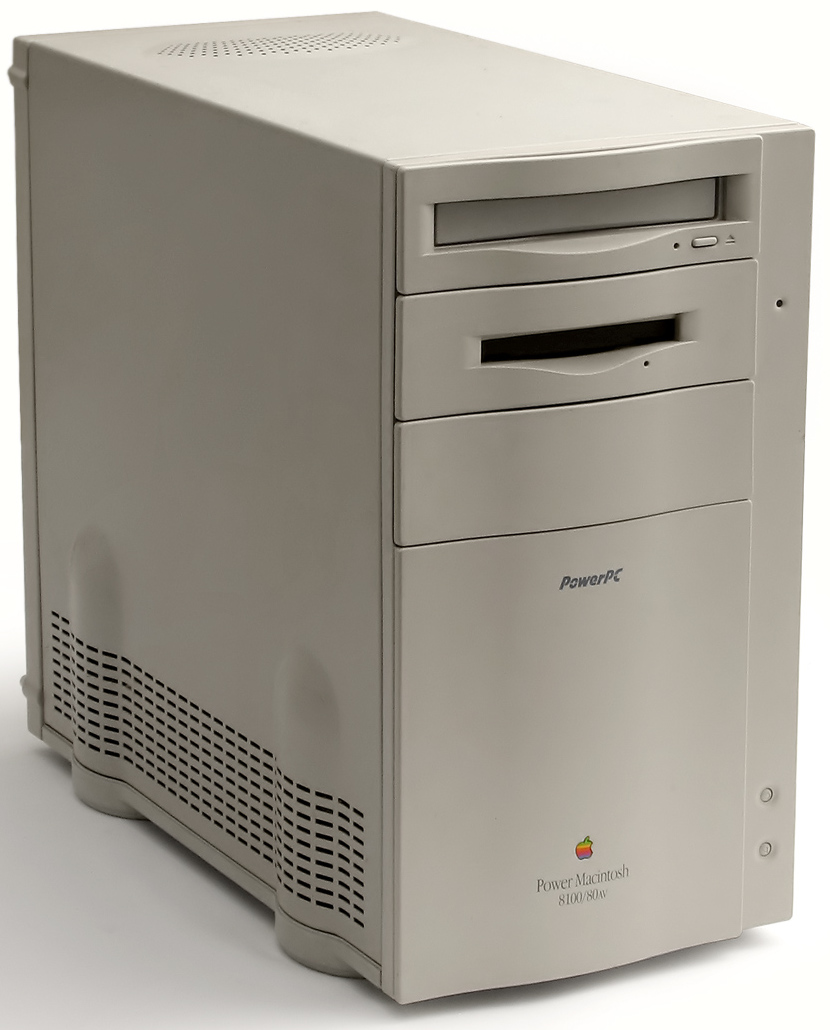
Power Macintosh series (8100/80AV shown), launched March 14, 1994

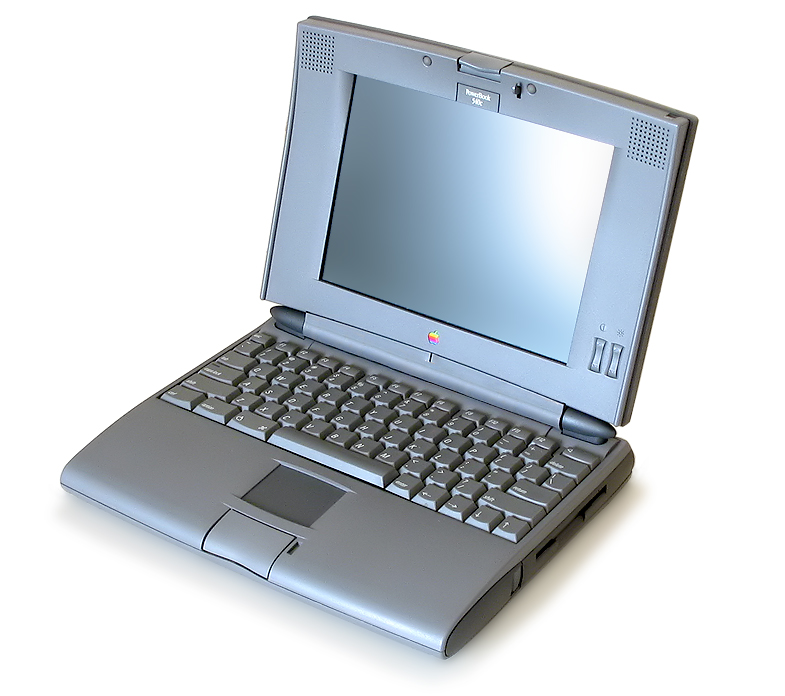
PowerBook 500 series (540 shown), launched May 16, 1994

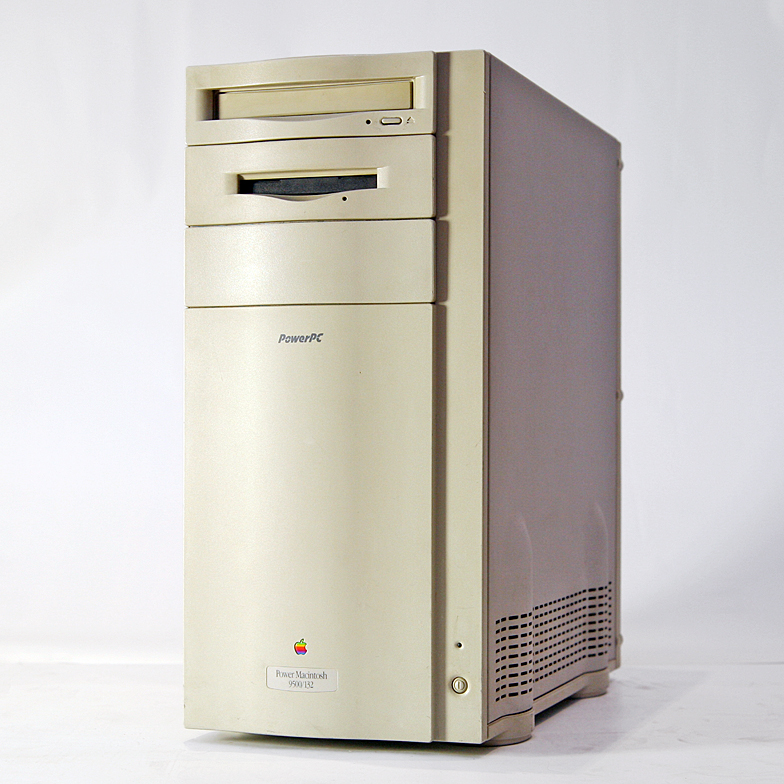
Power Macintosh 9500 (9500/132 shown), launched June 19, 1995

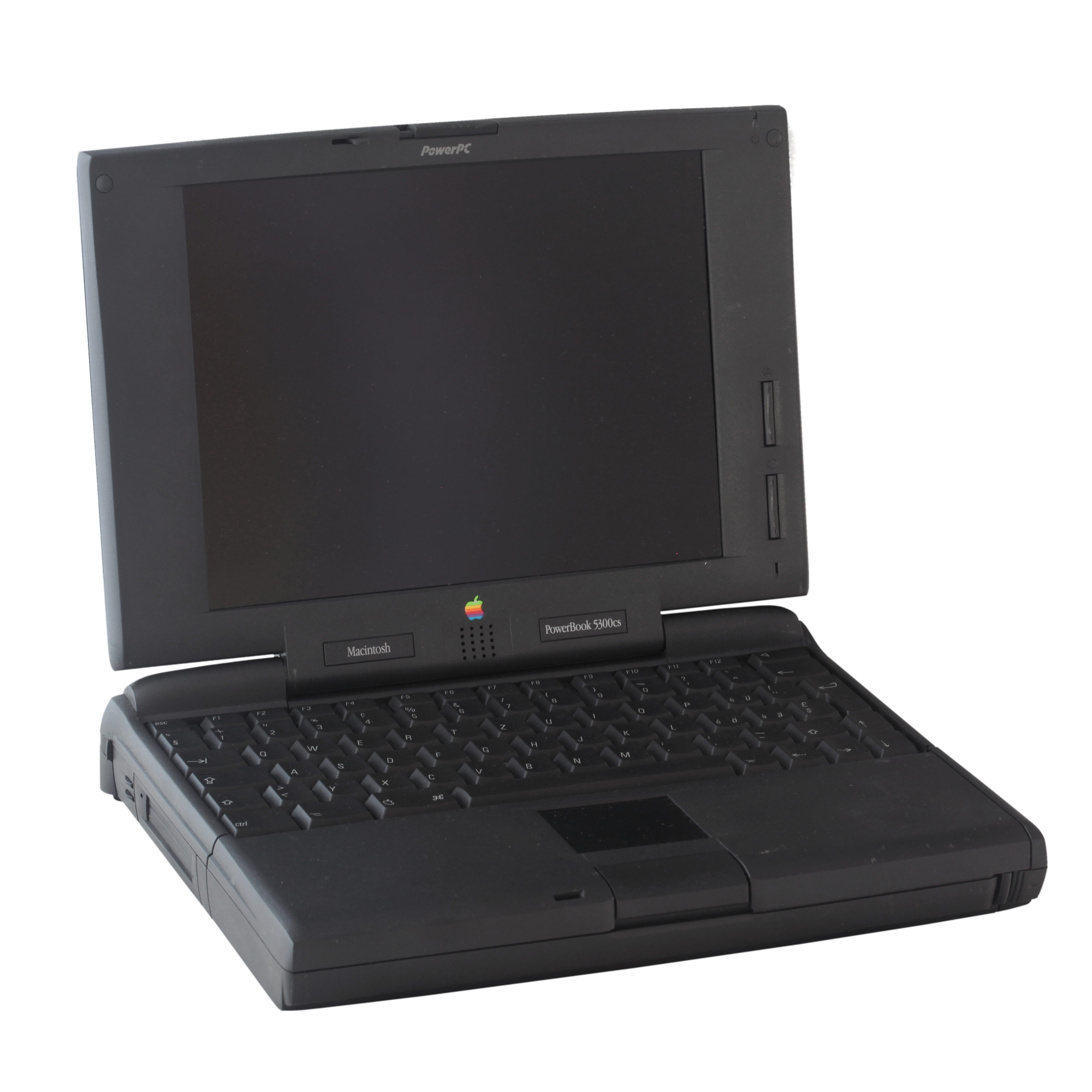
PowerBook 5300, launched August 28, 1995

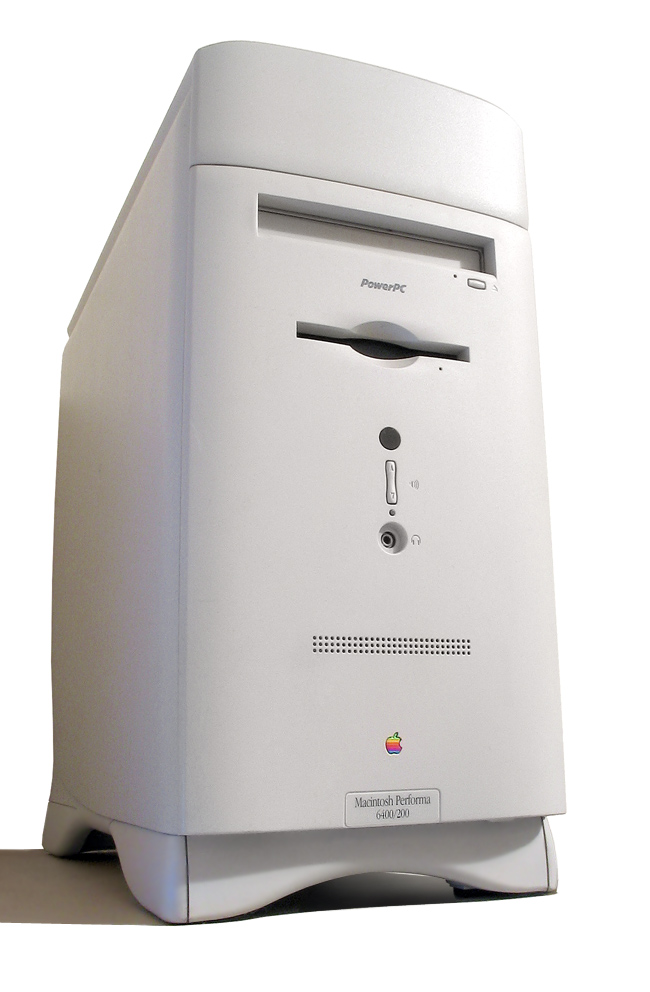
Power Macintosh 6400, launched October 23, 1996

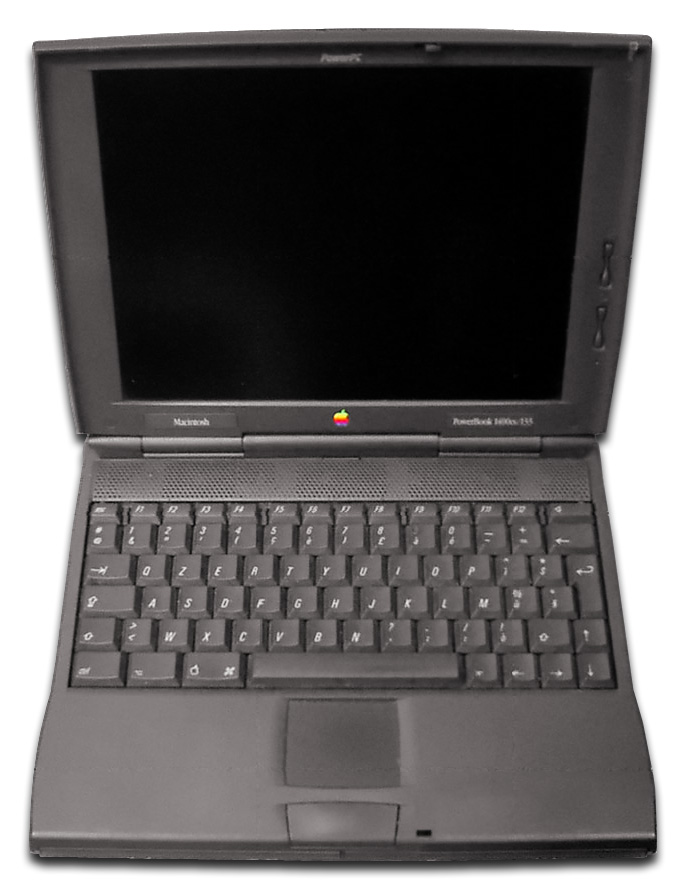
PowerBook 1400, launched November 20, 1996

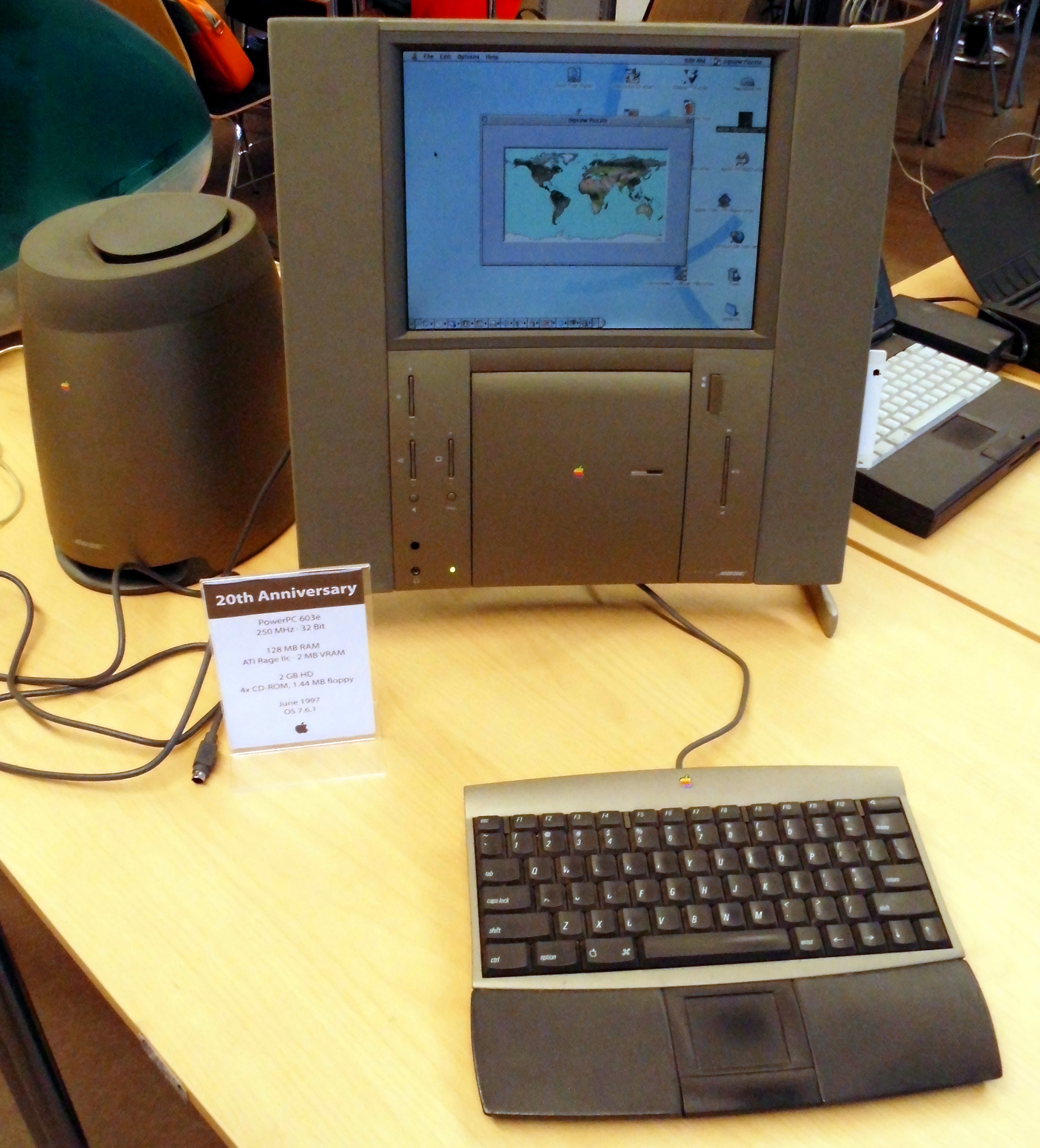
Twentieth Anniversary Macintosh, launched March 20, 1997

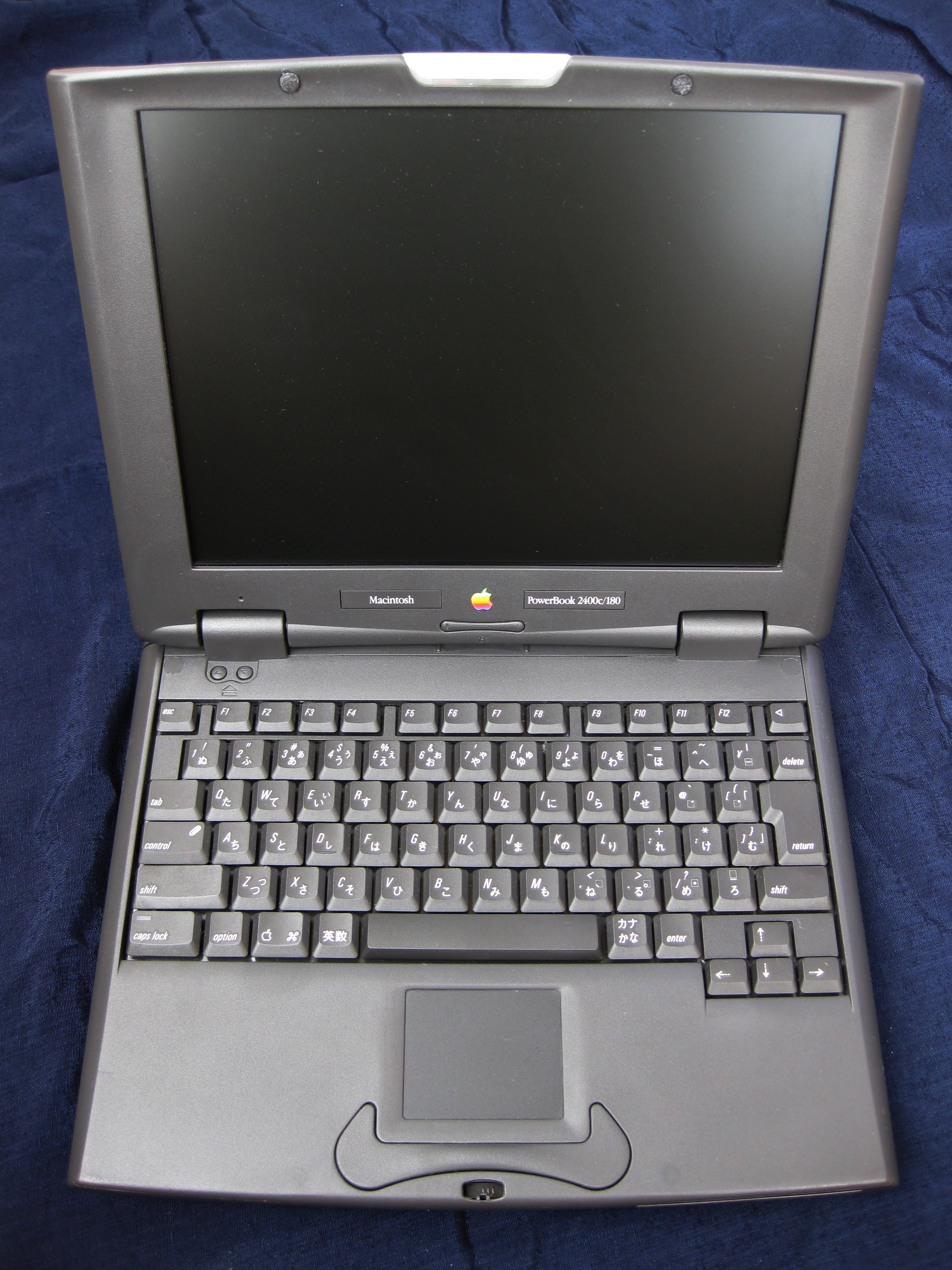
PowerBook 2400c, launched May 8, 1997

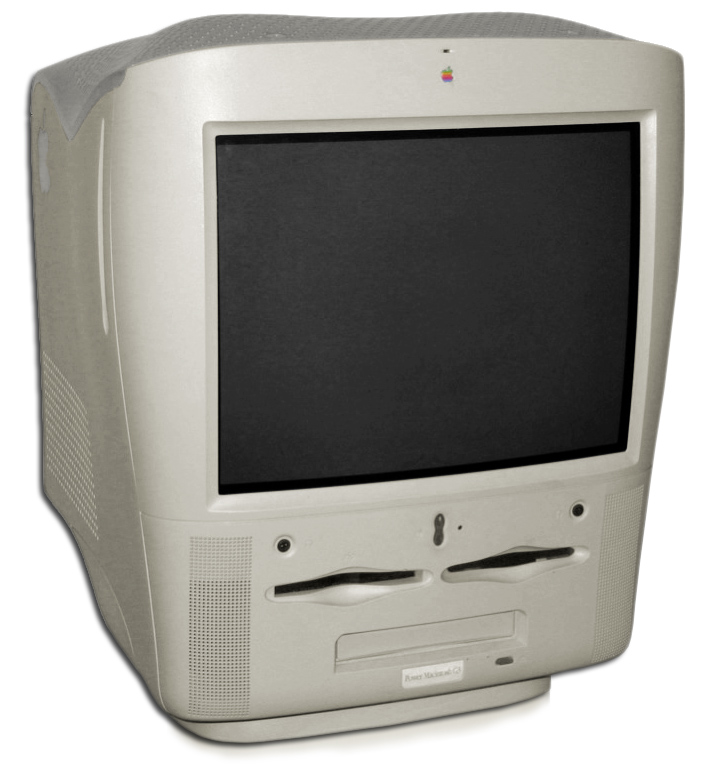
Power Macintosh G3 AIO, launched January 31, 1998

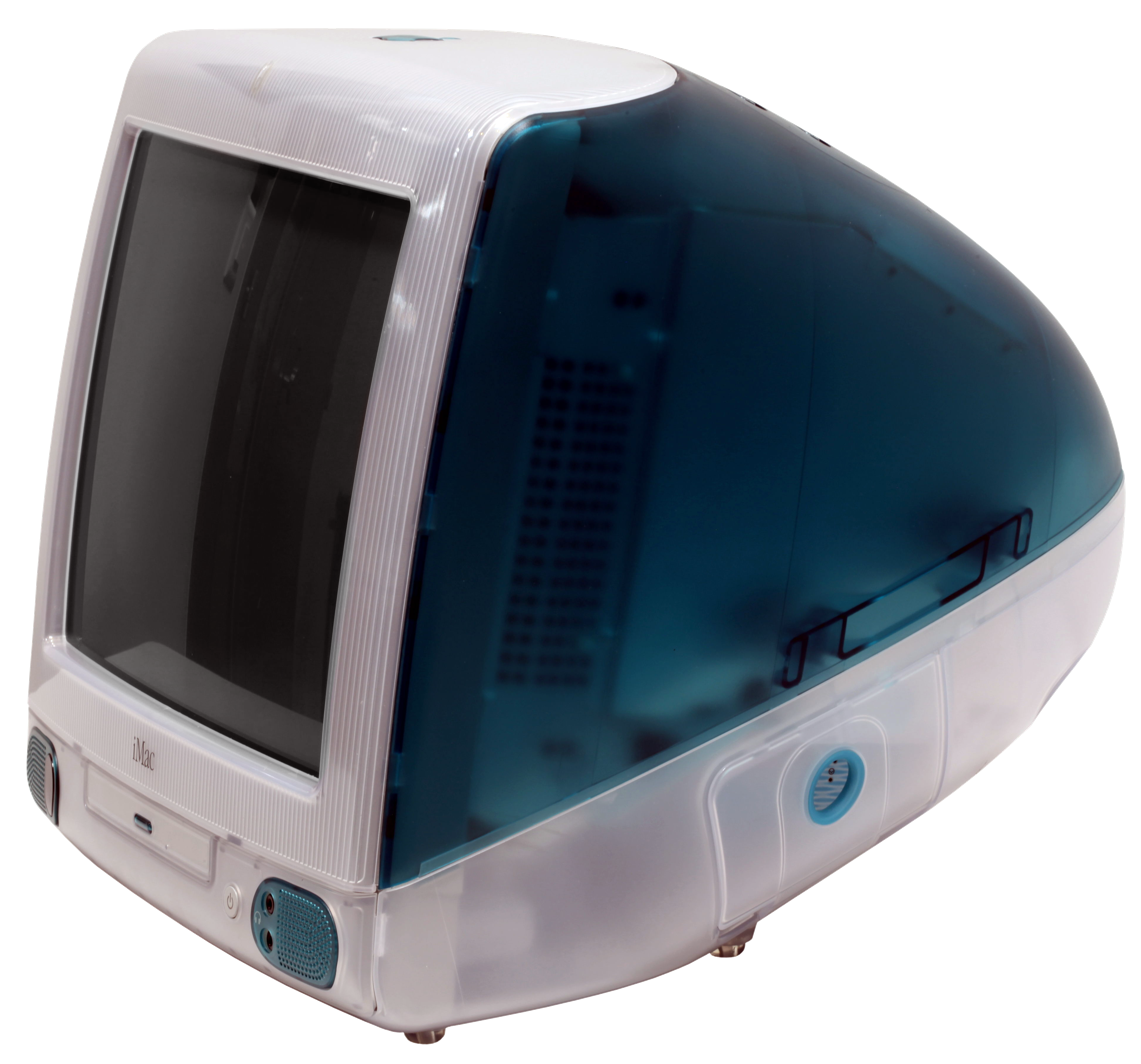
iMac (original G3), launched August 15, 1998

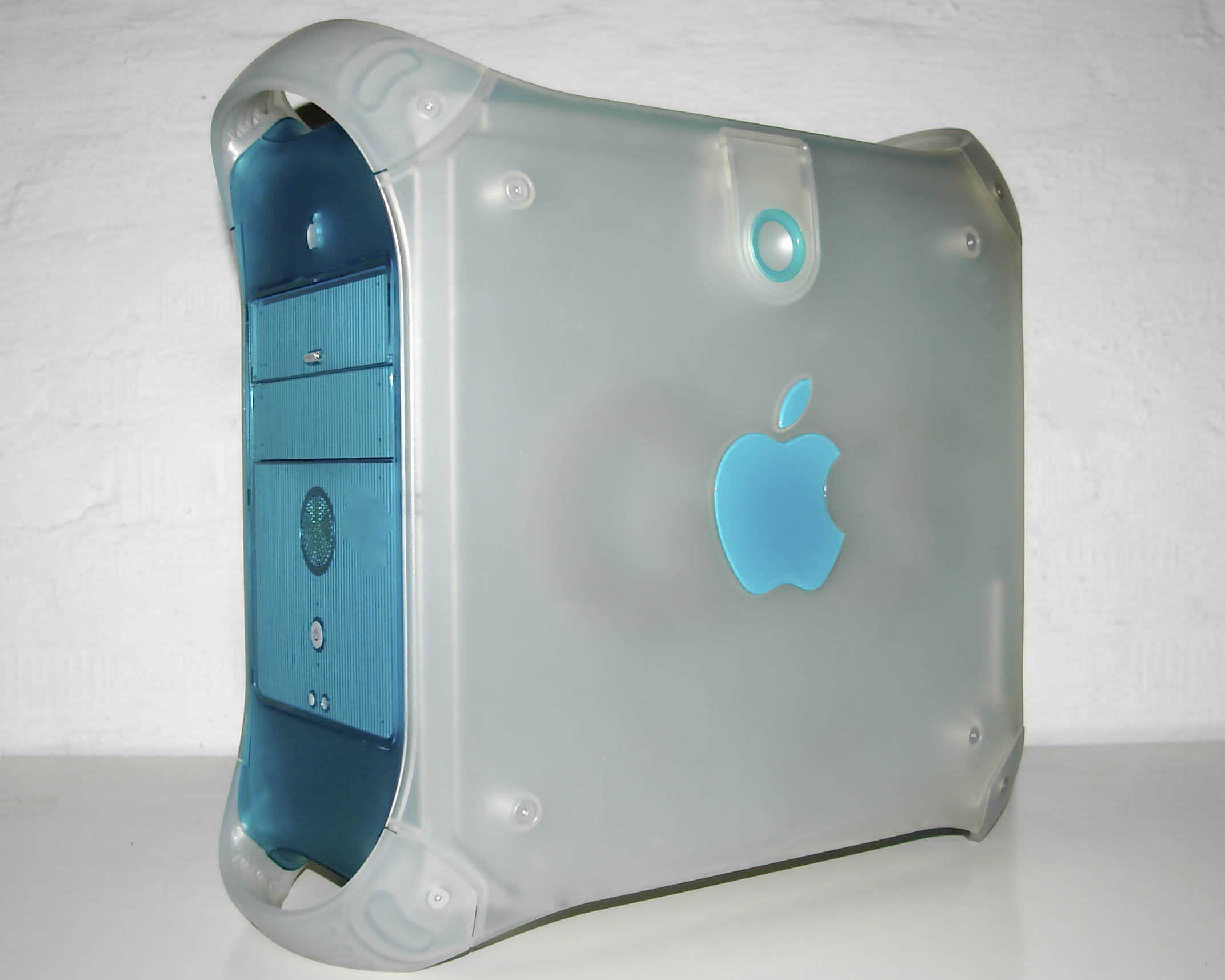
Power Macintosh G3 (Blue and White), launched January 5, 1999

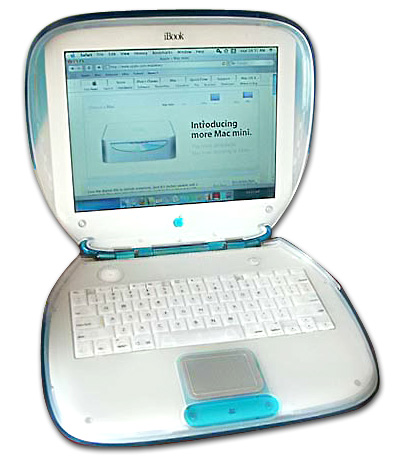
iBook, launched June 21, 1999

iMac G3 Slot Loading, launched October 5, 1999

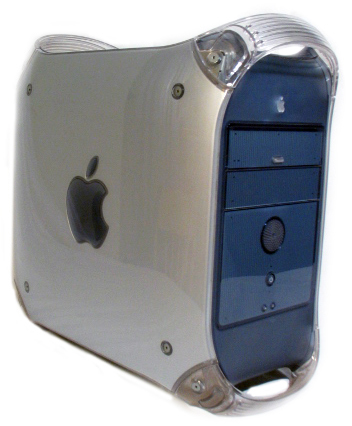
Power Mac G4 Graphite, launched October 13, 1999

Year	Launched	Model	Family	Discontinued
1990	March 19, 1990	Macintosh IIfx	Mac II	April 15, 1992
1990	October 15, 1990	Macintosh LC	LC	March 23, 1992
1990	October 15, 1990	Macintosh Classic	Compact	September 14, 1992
1990	October 15, 1990	Macintosh IIsi	Mac II	March 15, 1993
1991	February 11, 1991	Macintosh Portable (backlit screen)	Portable	October 21, 1991
1991	October 21, 1991	Macintosh Classic II	Compact	October 18, 1993
1991	October 21, 1991	Macintosh Quadra 700	Quadra	March 15, 1993
1991	October 21, 1991	Macintosh Quadra 900	Quadra	May 18, 1992
1991	October 21, 1991	PowerBook 100	PowerBook 100	August 3, 1992
1991	October 21, 1991	PowerBook 140	PowerBook 100	August 3, 1992
1991	October 21, 1991	PowerBook 170	PowerBook 100	October 19, 1992
1992	March 23, 1992	Macintosh LC II	LC	March 15, 1993
1992	May 18, 1992	Macintosh Quadra 950	Quadra	October 14, 1995
1992	August 3, 1992	PowerBook 145	PowerBook 100	July 7, 1993
1992	October 19, 1992	Macintosh IIvi	Mac II	February 10, 1993
1992	October 19, 1992	Macintosh IIvx	Mac II	October 19, 1993
1992	October 19, 1992	PowerBook 160	PowerBook 100	August 16, 1993
1992	October 19, 1992	PowerBook 180	PowerBook 100	May 16, 1994
1992	October 19, 1992	PowerBook Duo 210	PowerBook Duo	October 21, 1993
1992	October 19, 1992	PowerBook Duo 230	PowerBook Duo	July 27, 1994
1993	February 10, 1993	Macintosh LC III	LC	February 14, 1994
1993	February 10, 1993	Macintosh Color Classic	Compact	May 16, 1994
1993	February 10, 1993	Macintosh Centris/Quadra 610	Centris	October 21, 1993
1993	February 10, 1993	Macintosh Centris/Quadra 650	Centris	October 21, 1993
1993	February 10, 1993	Macintosh Quadra 800	Quadra	March 14, 1994
1993	February 10, 1993	PowerBook 165c	PowerBook 100	December 13, 1993
1993	March 22, 1993	Workgroup Server 80	Workgroup Server	October 17, 1994
1993	March 22, 1993	Workgroup Server 95	Workgroup Server	April 3, 1995
1993	June 7, 1993	PowerBook 145B	PowerBook 100	July 18, 1994
1993	June 7, 1993	PowerBook 180c	PowerBook 100	March 14, 1994
1993	June 28, 1993	Macintosh LC 520	LC	February 2, 1994
1993	July 26, 1993	Workgroup Server 60	Workgroup Server	October 17, 1994
1993	July 29, 1993	Macintosh Centris/Quadra 660AV	Quadra	September 12, 1994
1993	July 29, 1993	Macintosh Quadra 840AV	Quadra	July 18, 1994
1993	August 16, 1993	PowerBook 165	PowerBook 100	July 18, 1994
1993	October 10, 1993	Macintosh Color Classic II	Compact	November 1, 1995
1993	October 18, 1993	Macintosh LC III+	LC	February 14, 1994
1993	October 21, 1993	Macintosh Quadra 605	Quadra	October 17, 1994
1993	October 21, 1993	Macintosh Quadra 610	Quadra	July 18, 1994
1993	October 21, 1993	Macintosh Quadra 650	Quadra	September 12, 1994
1993	October 21, 1993	Macintosh TV	LC	February 1, 1995
1993	October 21, 1993	PowerBook Duo 250	PowerBook Duo	May 16, 1994
1993	October 21, 1993	PowerBook Duo 270c	PowerBook Duo	May 16, 1994
1994	February 2, 1994	Macintosh LC 550	LC	March 23, 1995
1994	February 2, 1994	Macintosh LC 575	LC	April 3, 1995
1994	March 14, 1994	Power Macintosh 6100	Power Macintosh	October 14, 1995
1994	March 14, 1994	Power Macintosh 7100	Power Macintosh	August 5, 1996
1994	March 14, 1994	Power Macintosh 8100	Power Macintosh	August 5, 1996
1994	April 26, 1994	Workgroup Server 6150	Workgroup Server	October 1, 1995
1994	April 26, 1994	Workgroup Server 8150	Workgroup Server	February 26, 1996
1994	April 26, 1994	Workgroup Server 9150	Workgroup Server	February 26, 1996
1994	May 16, 1994	PowerBook 520/c	PowerBook 500	September 16, 1995
1994	May 16, 1994	PowerBook 540/c	PowerBook 500	August 16, 1995
1994	May 16, 1994	PowerBook 550	PowerBook 500	April 1, 1996
1994	May 16, 1994	PowerBook Duo 280	PowerBook Duo	November 14, 1994
1994	May 16, 1994	PowerBook Duo 280c	PowerBook Duo	January 1, 1996
1994	July 18, 1994	Macintosh Quadra 630	Quadra	April 17, 1995
1994	July 18, 1994	PowerBook 150	PowerBook 100	October 14, 1995
1995	April 3, 1995	Macintosh LC 580	LC	August 1, 1995
1995	April 3, 1995	Power Macintosh 5200 LC	Power Macintosh	April 13, 1996
1995	May 1, 1995	Power Macintosh 6200	Power Macintosh	May 1, 1996
1995	June 19, 1995	Power Macintosh 9500	Power Macintosh	February 17, 1997
1995	August 7, 1995	Power Macintosh 7200	Power Macintosh	February 1, 1997
1995	August 7, 1995	Power Macintosh 7500	Power Macintosh	April 1, 1996
1995	August 7, 1995	Power Macintosh 8500	Power Macintosh	February 17, 1997
1995	August 28, 1995	PowerBook 190	PowerBook 100	September 1, 1996
1995	August 28, 1995	PowerBook 5300	PowerBook 500	August 3, 1996
1995	August 28, 1995	PowerBook Duo 2300c	PowerBook Duo	February 1, 1997
1995	August 28, 1995	Power Macintosh 5300 LC	Power Macintosh	April 1, 1996
1996	February 15, 1996	Apple Network Server 500	Network Server (non-Mac PPC)	April 1, 1997
1996	February 15, 1996	Apple Network Server 700/150	Network Server (non-Mac PPC)	April 1, 1997
1996	February 26, 1996	Workgroup Server 7250	Workgroup Server	April 21, 1997
1996	February 26, 1996	Workgroup Server 8550	Workgroup Server	April 21, 1997
1996	April 15, 1996	Power Macintosh 5260	Power Macintosh	March 1, 1997
1996	April 15, 1996	Power Macintosh 5400	Power Macintosh	March 31, 1998
1996	April 22, 1996	Power Macintosh 7600	Power Macintosh	November 10, 1997
1996	June 27, 1996	Power Macintosh 6300	Power Macintosh	July 1, 1997
1996	October 16, 1996	Apple Network Server 700/200	Network Server (non-Mac PPC)	April 1, 1997
1996	October 23, 1996	Power Macintosh 6400	Power Macintosh	May 1, 1997
1996	November 15, 1996	Power Macintosh 4400	Power Macintosh	October 11, 1997
1996	November 20, 1996	PowerBook 1400	PowerBook	May 6, 1998
1997	February 17, 1997	Power Macintosh 5500	Power Macintosh	August 31, 1998
1997	February 17, 1997	Power Macintosh 6500	Power Macintosh	March 14, 1998
1997	February 17, 1997	Power Macintosh 7220	Power Macintosh	January 1, 1998
1997	February 17, 1997	Power Macintosh 7300	Power Macintosh	November 10, 1997
1997	February 17, 1997	Power Macintosh 8600	Power Macintosh	February 17, 1998
1997	February 17, 1997	Power Macintosh 9600	Power Macintosh	March 17, 1998
1997	February 17, 1997	PowerBook 3400c	PowerBook	March 14, 1998
1997	March 20, 1997	Twentieth Anniversary Macintosh	Power Macintosh	March 14, 1998
1997	April 21, 1997	Workgroup Server 7350	Workgroup Server	March 2, 1998
1997	April 21, 1997	Workgroup Server 9650	Workgroup Server	March 2, 1998
1997	May 8, 1997	PowerBook 2400c	PowerBook	March 14, 1998
1997	November 10, 1997	Power Macintosh G3 desktop	Power Macintosh	December 14, 1998
1997	November 10, 1997	Power Macintosh G3 minitower	Power Macintosh	December 14, 1998
1997	November 10, 1997	PowerBook G3 (Original / "Kanga")	PowerBook G3	March 14, 1998
1998	January 31, 1998	Power Macintosh G3 AIO	Power Macintosh	October 17, 1998
1998	March 2, 1998	Macintosh Server G3	Workgroup Server	January 1, 1999
1998	May 1, 1998	PowerBook G3 ("Wallstreet")	PowerBook G3	August 31, 1998
1998	August 15, 1998	iMac G3 (Revision A)	iMac	January 5, 1999
1998	August 15, 1998	PowerBook G3 ("Wallstreet II, PDQ")	PowerBook G3	May 10, 1999
1998	October 26, 1998	iMac G3 (Revision B)	iMac	January 5, 1999
1999	January 5, 1999	Power Macintosh G3 Blue and White ("Yosemite")	Power Macintosh	October 13, 1999
1999	January 5, 1999	Macintosh Server G3 Blue and White	Workgroup Server	August 31, 1999
1999	January 5, 1999	iMac G3 266 (Revision C)	iMac	April 14, 1999
1999	April 14, 1999	iMac G3 333 (Revision D)	iMac	October 5, 1999
1999	May 10, 1999	PowerBook G3 ("Lombard")	PowerBook G3	February 16, 2000
1999	June 21, 1999	iBook	iBook	September 13, 2000
1999	August 31, 1999	Macintosh Server G4	Workgroup Server	July 19, 2000
1999	August 31, 1999	Power Mac G4 Graphite	Power Mac	June 20, 2004
1999	October 5, 1999	iMac G3 Slot Loading (Fall 1999)	iMac	March 18, 2003

=== 2000s ===
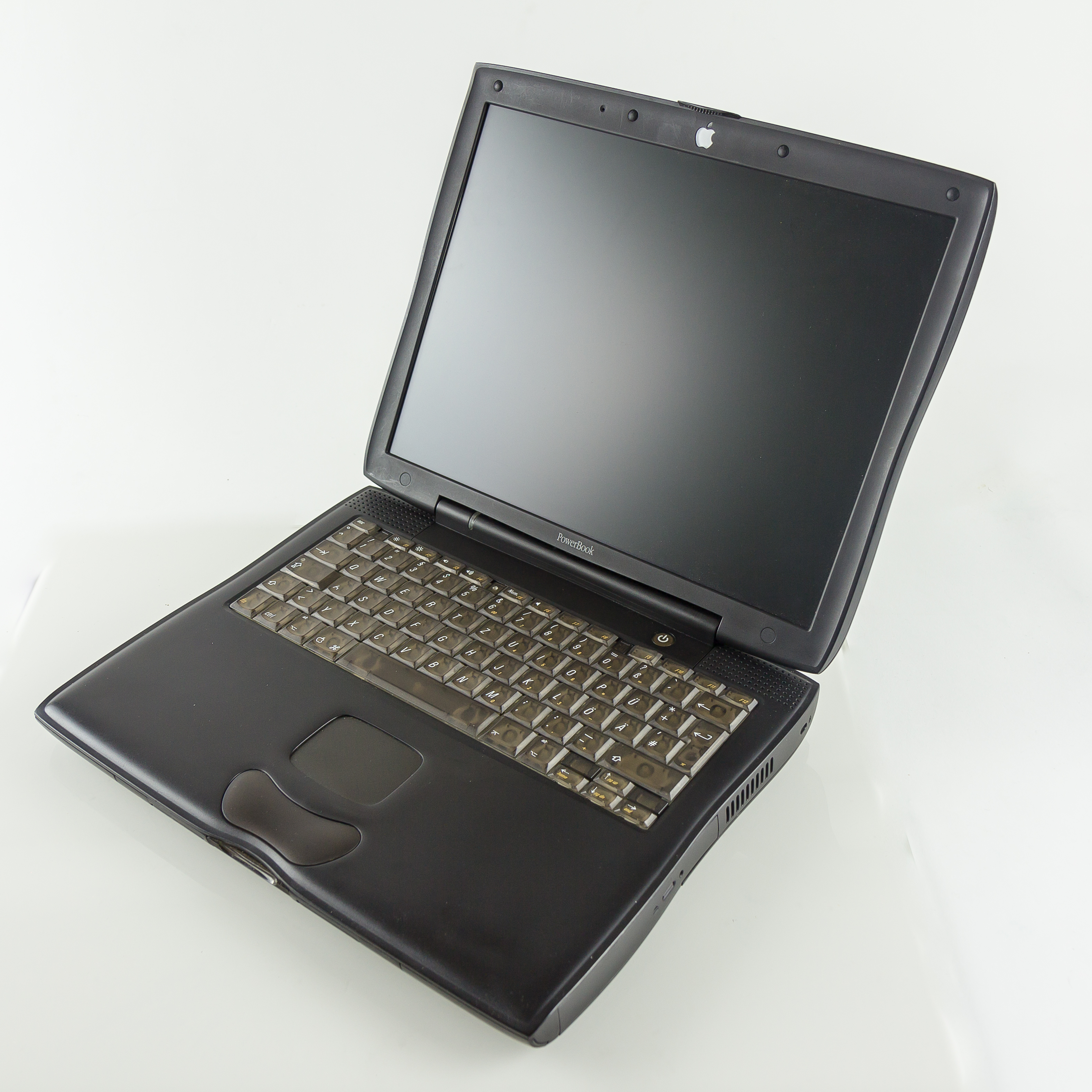
PowerBook FireWire (G3 "Pismo"), launched February 16, 2000

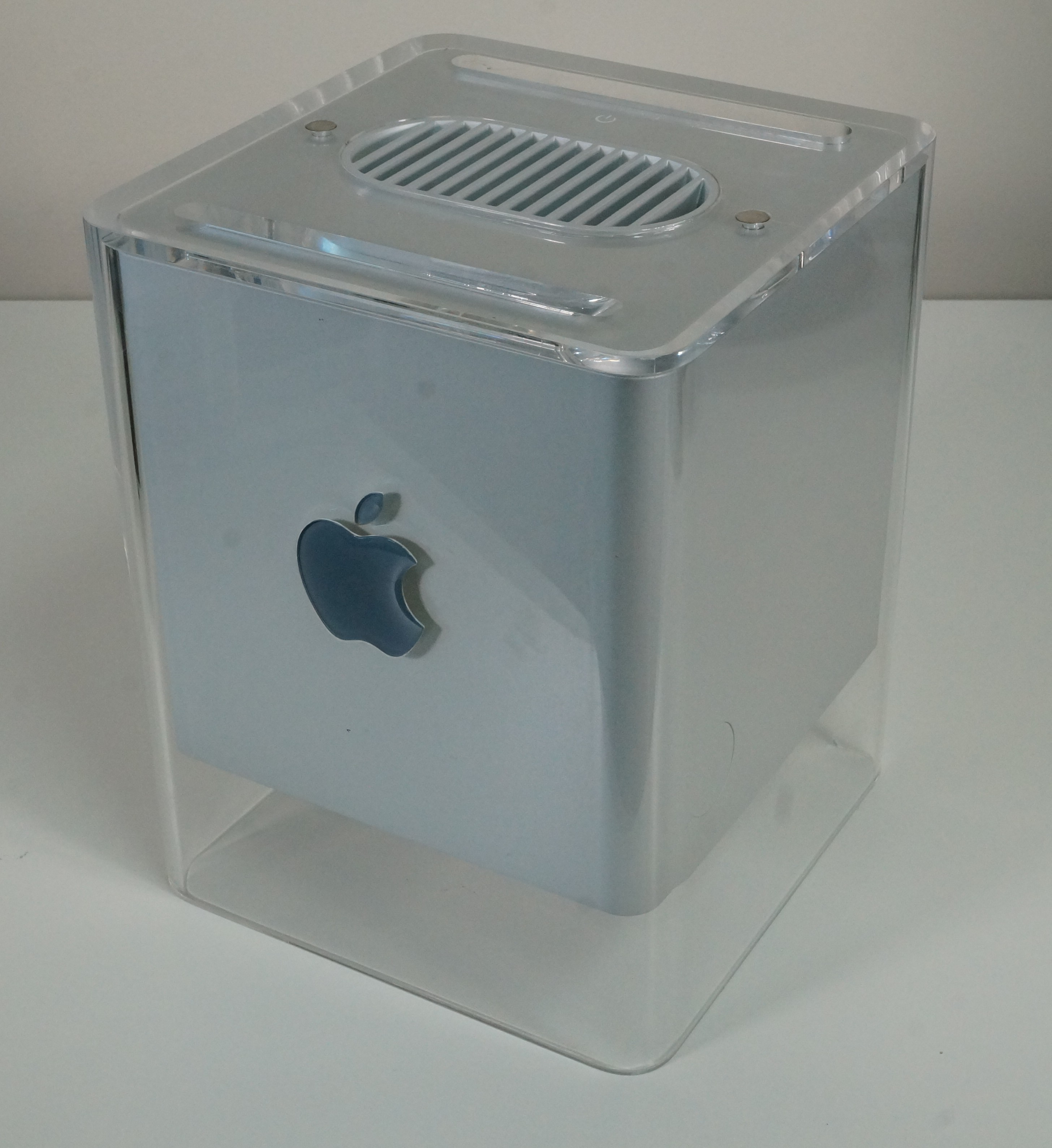
Power Mac G4 Cube, launched July 19, 2000

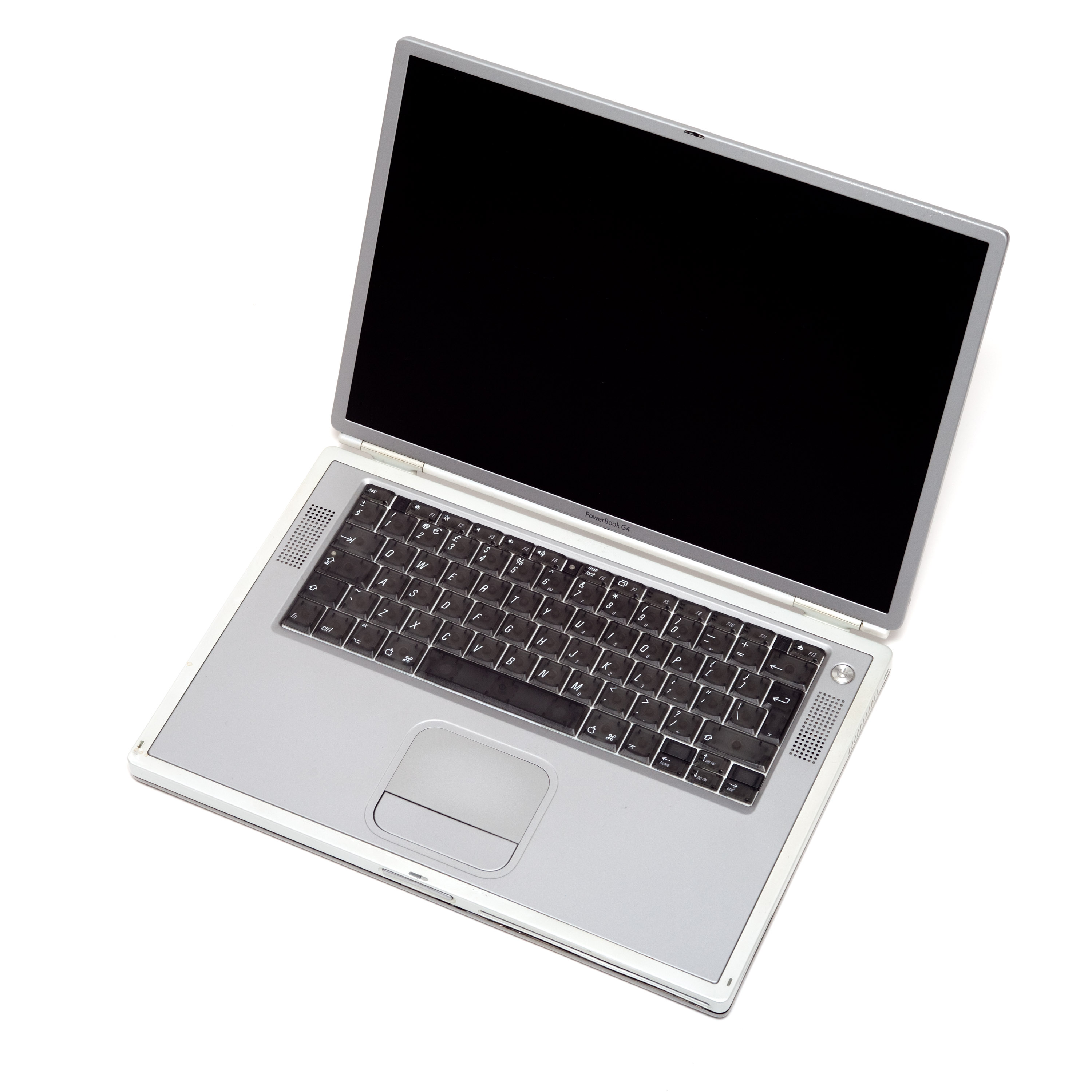
PowerBook G4 Titanium, launched January 7, 2001

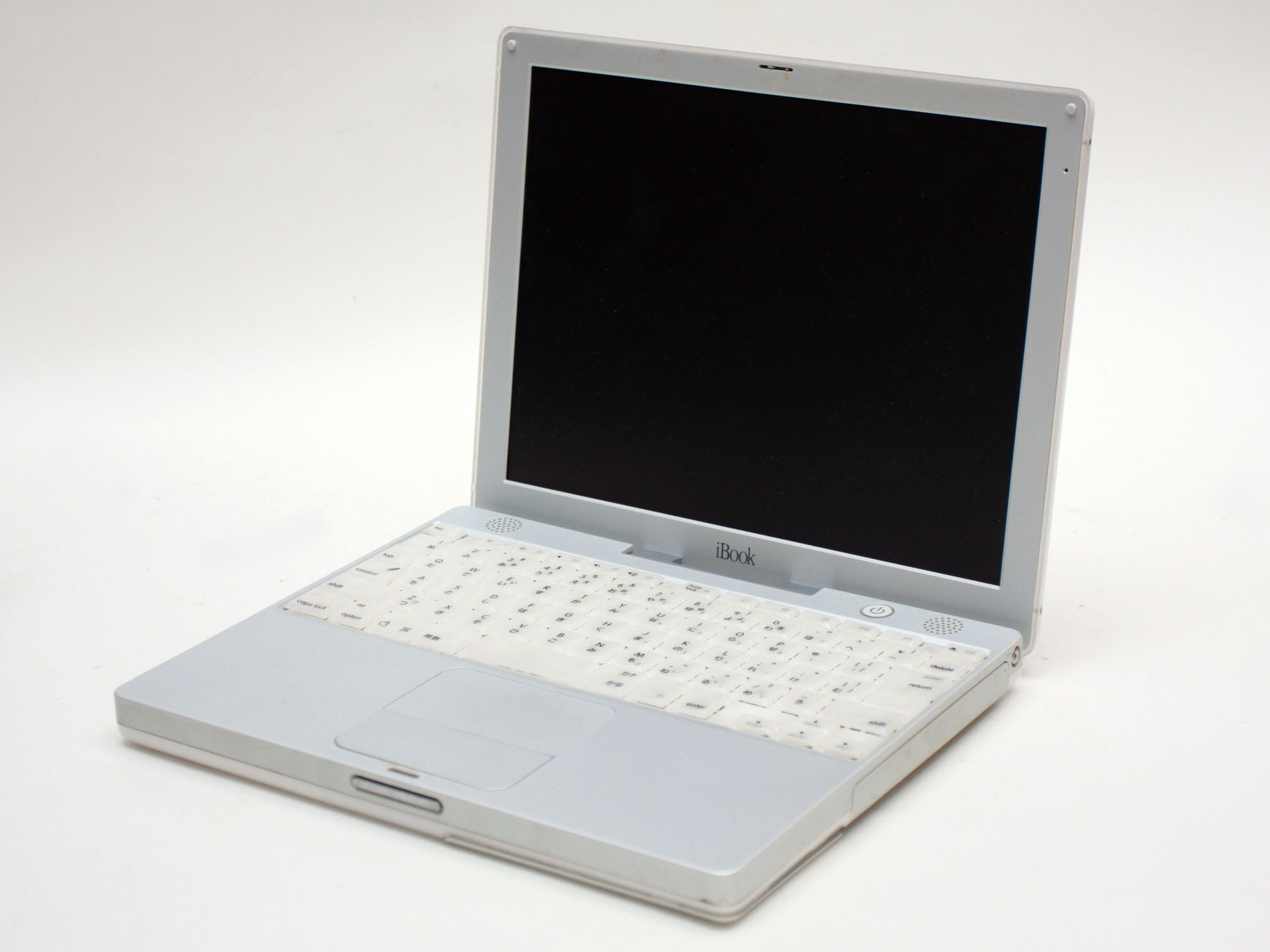
iBook G3 Dual USB ("Snow"), launched May 1, 2001

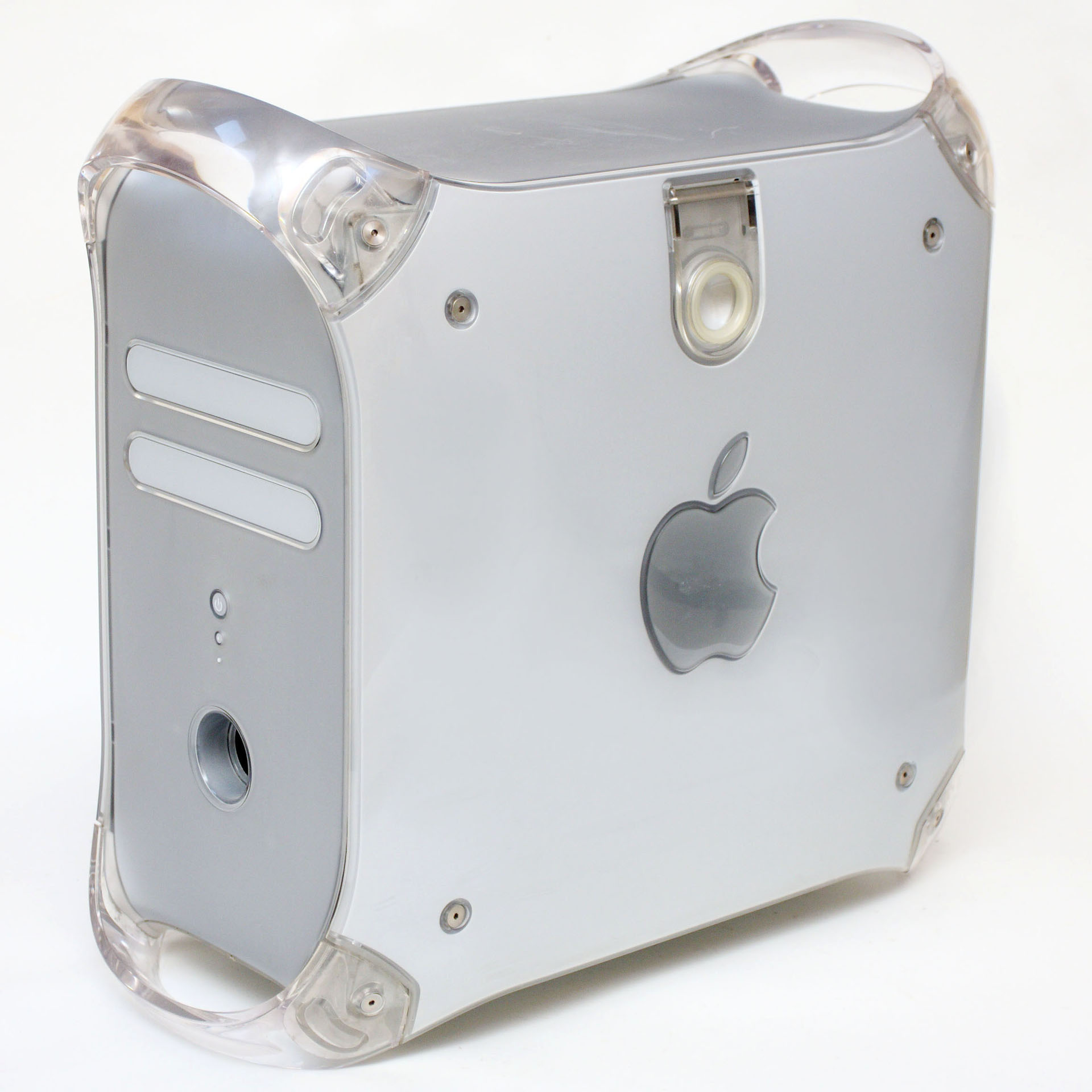
Power Mac G4 Quicksilver, launched July 18, 2001

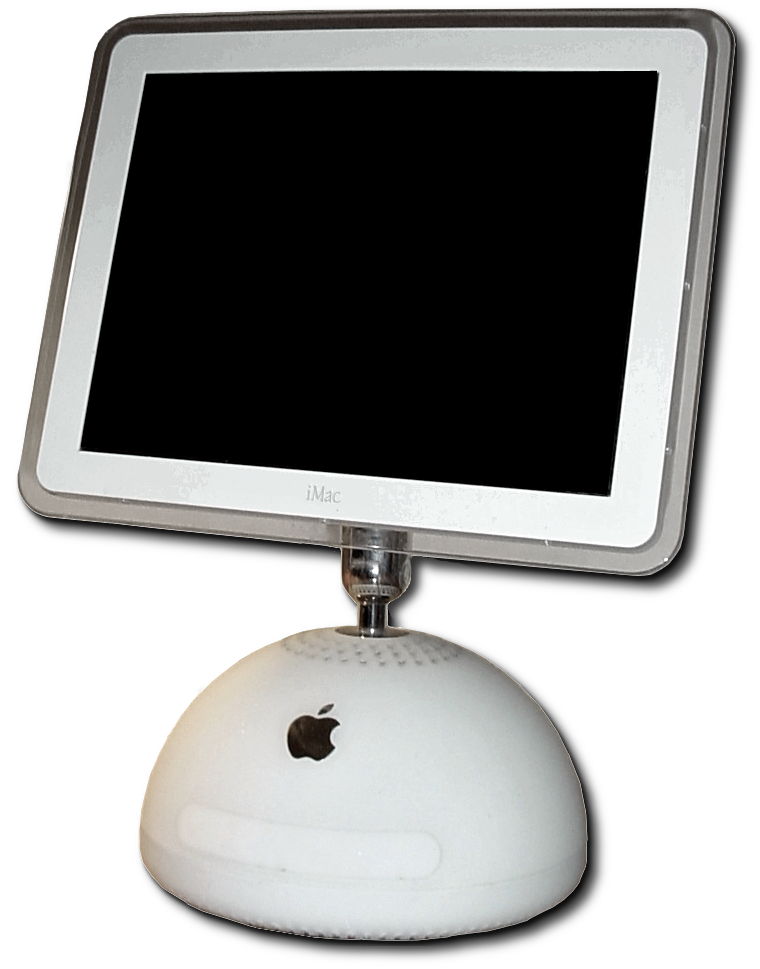
iMac G4, launched January 7, 2002

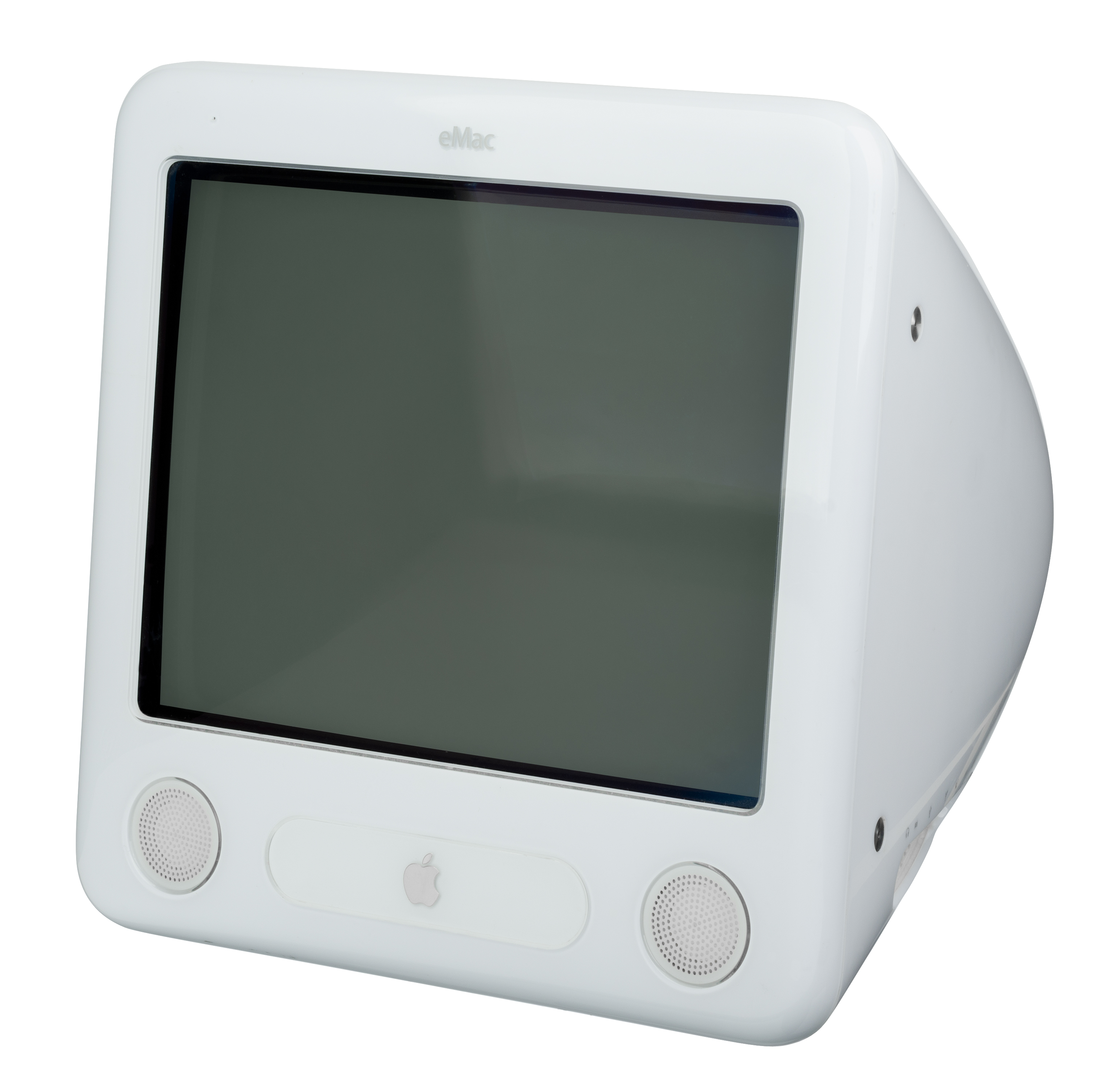
eMac, launched April 29, 2002

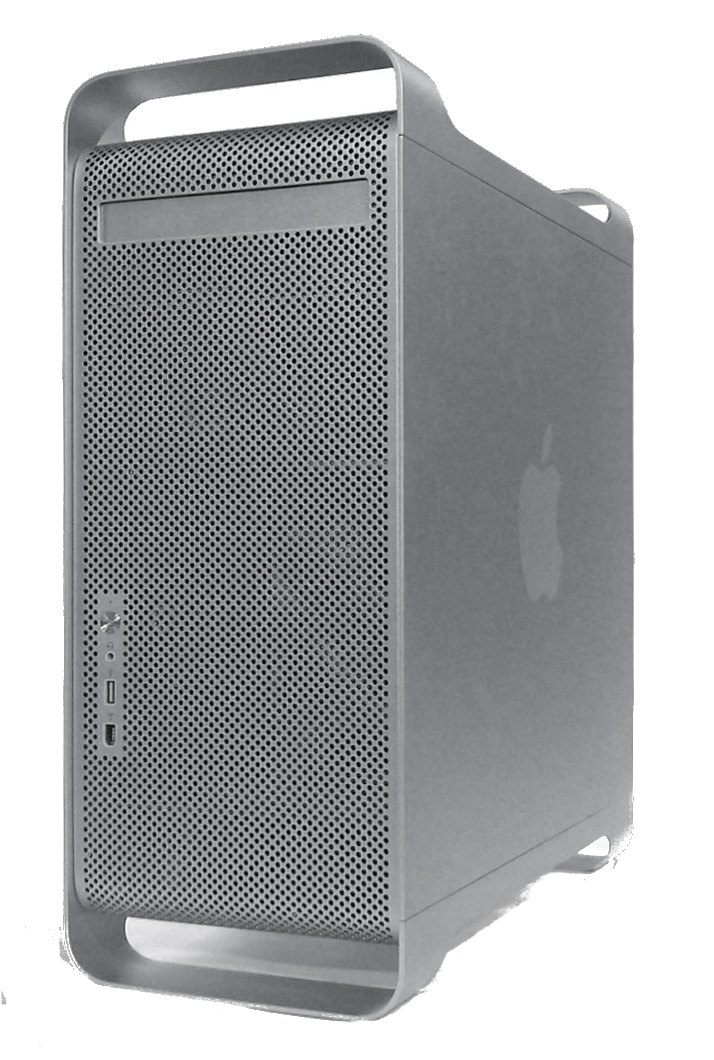
Power Mac G5, launched June 23, 2003

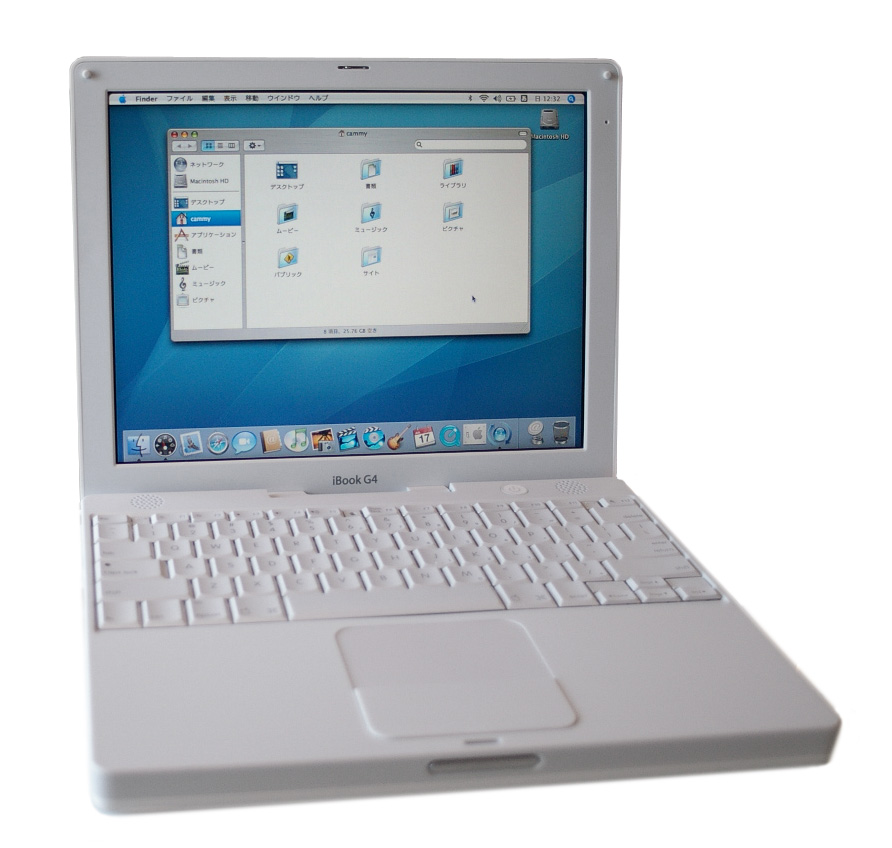
iBook G4, launched October 22, 2003

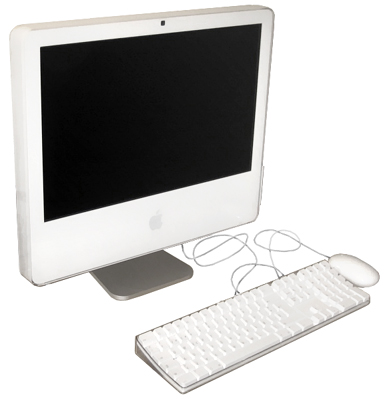
iMac G5, launched August 31, 2004

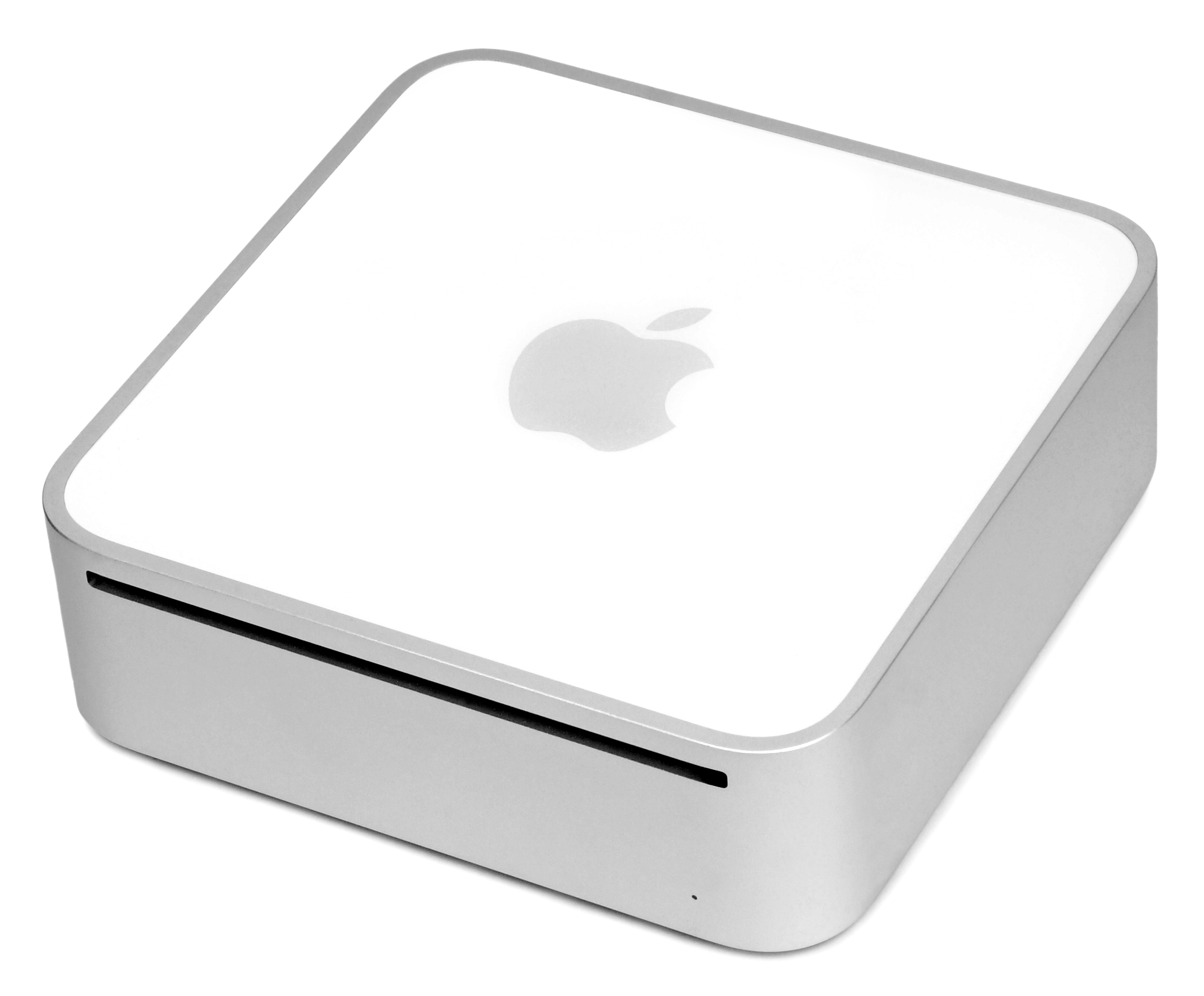
Mac Mini, launched January 11, 2005

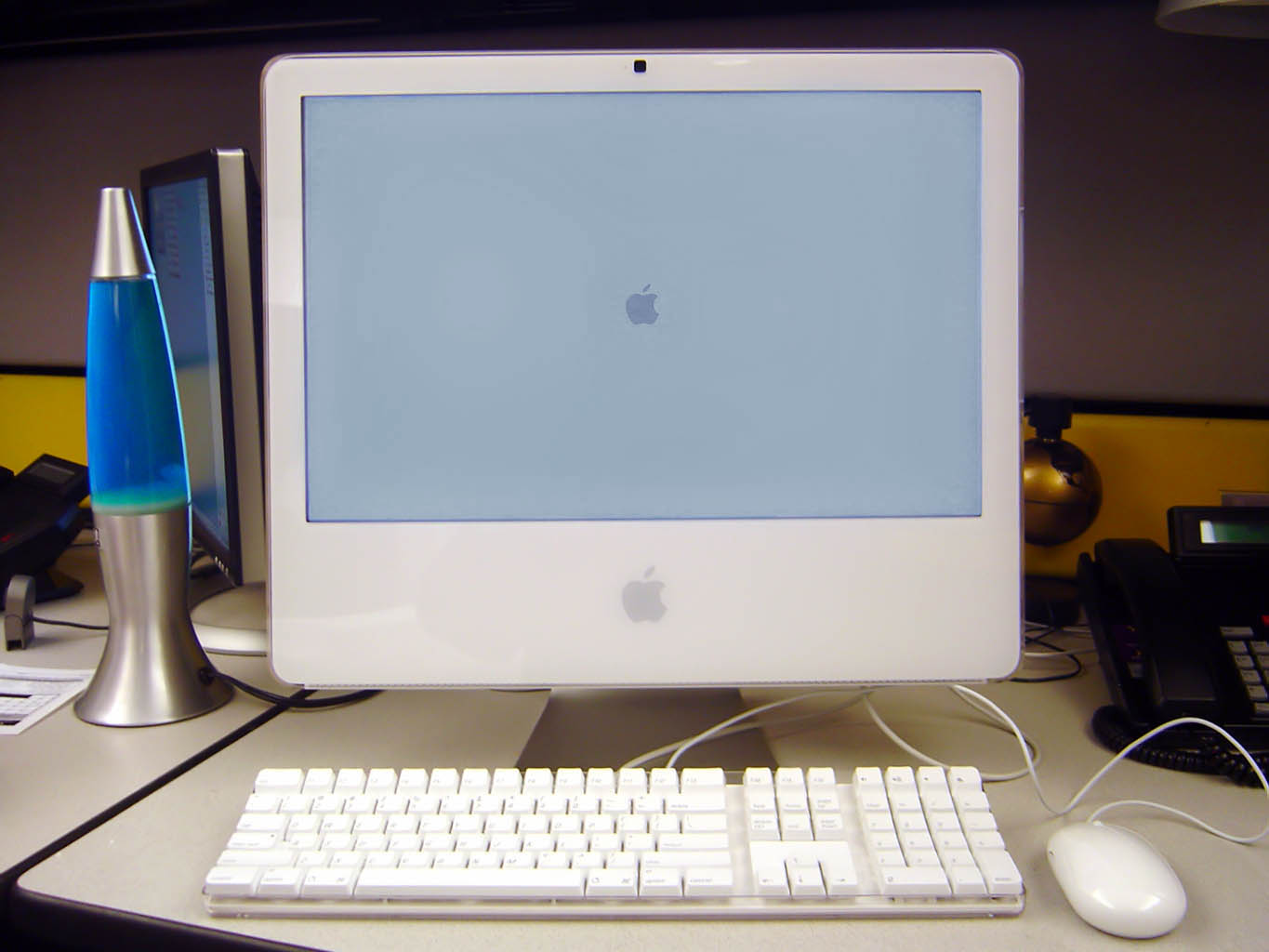
Polycarbonate iMac (replacing the iMac G5) launched January 10, 2006

Mac Pro (replacing the Power Mac G5) launched August 7, 2006

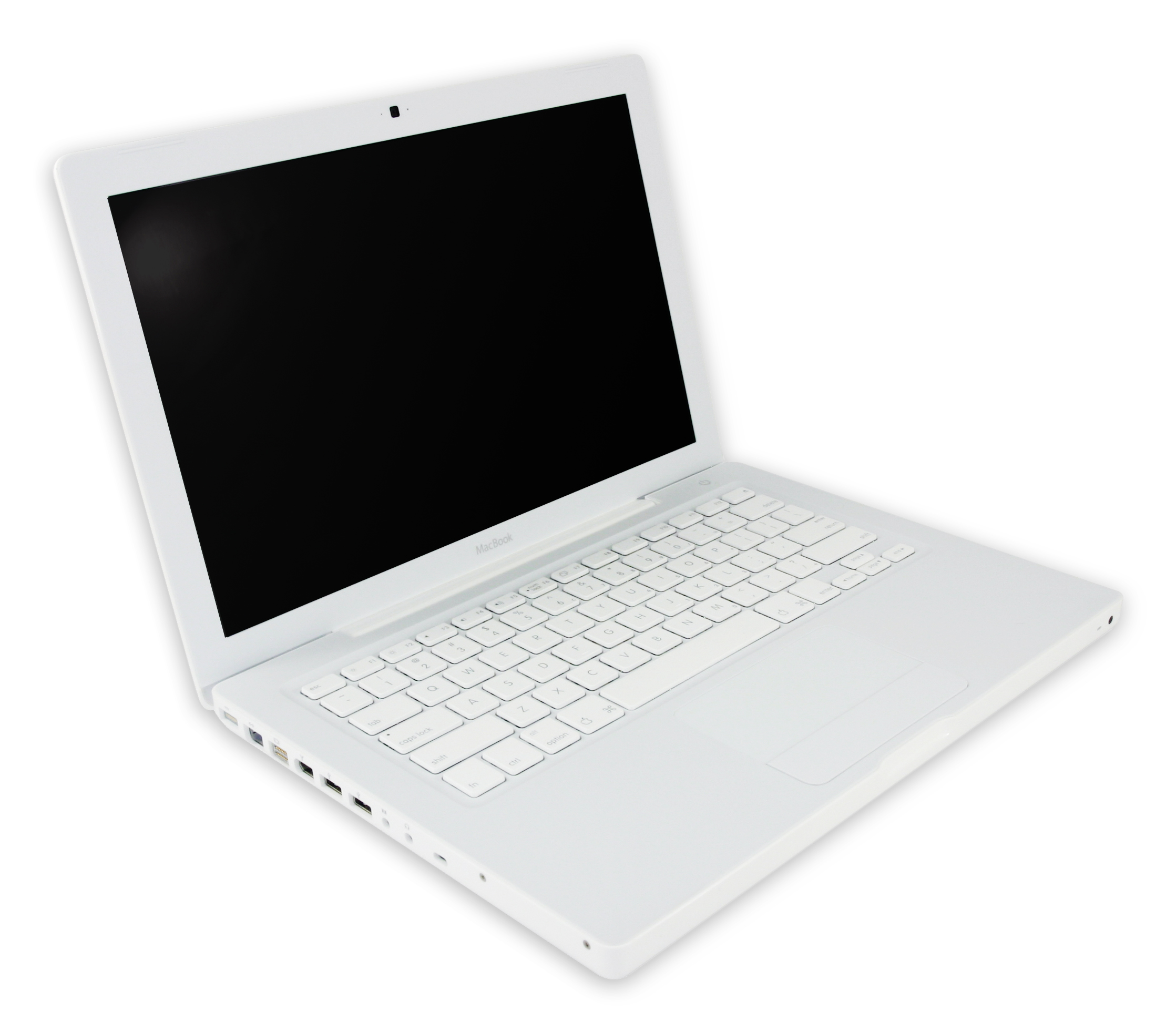
MacBook (replacing the iBook) launched May 16, 2006

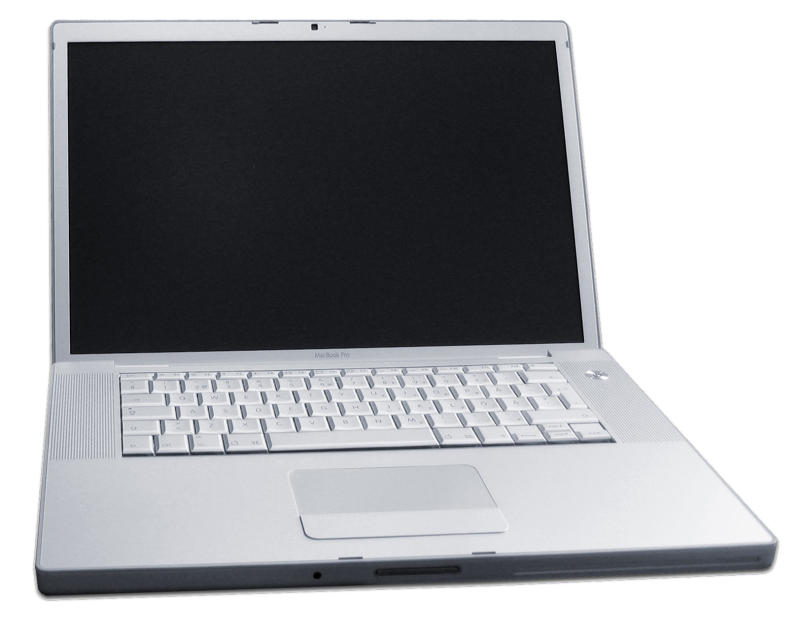
MacBook Pro (replacing the PowerBook G4) launched January 10, 2006

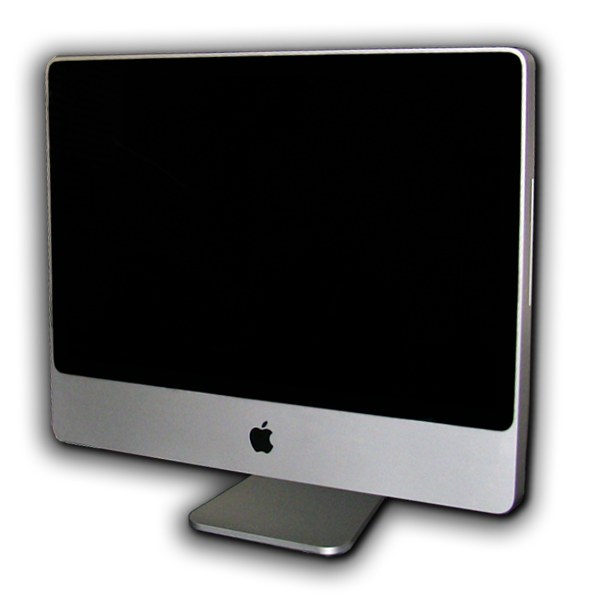
iMac Aluminum, launched August 7, 2007

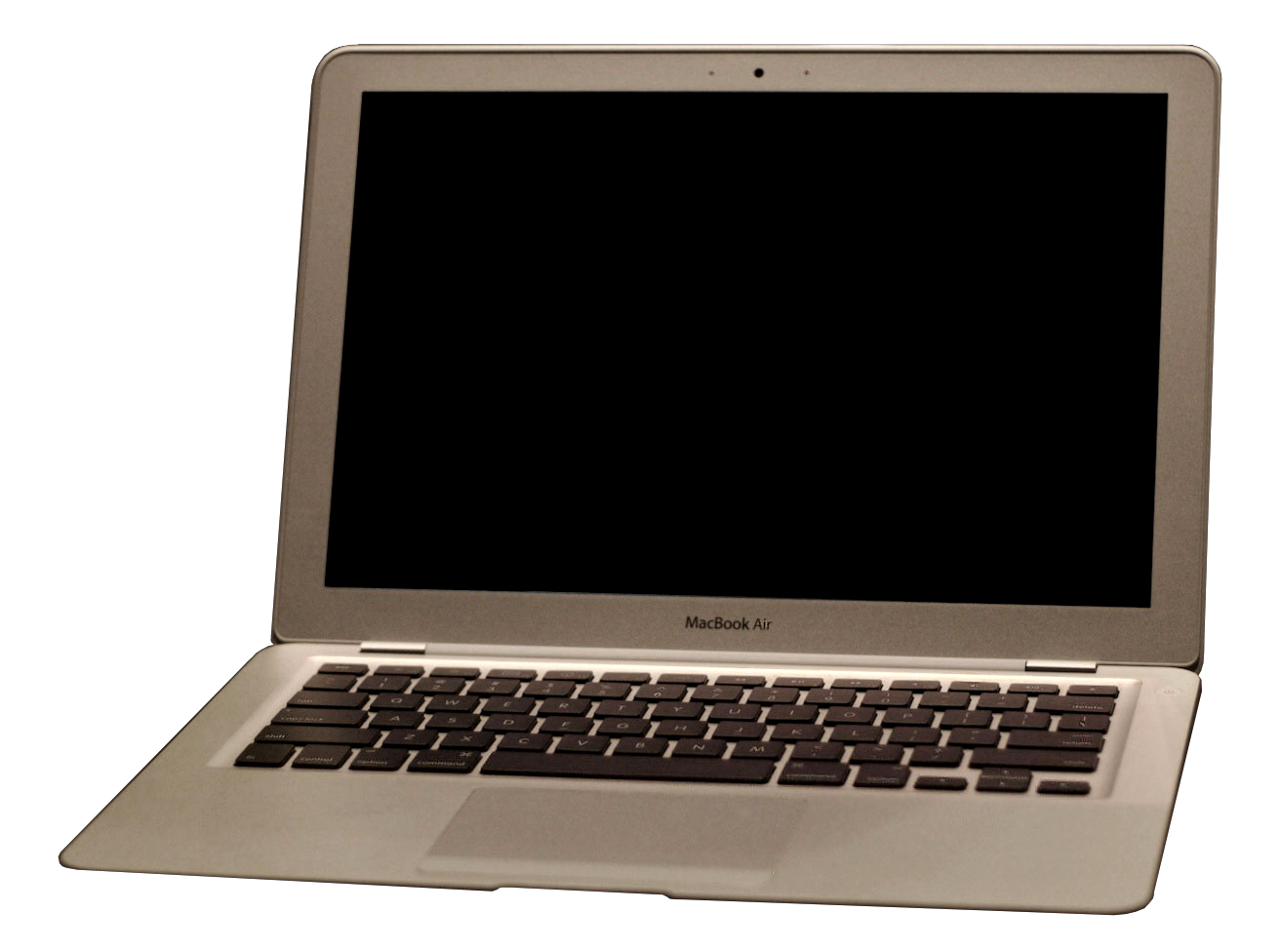
MacBook Air Unibody, launched January 15, 2008

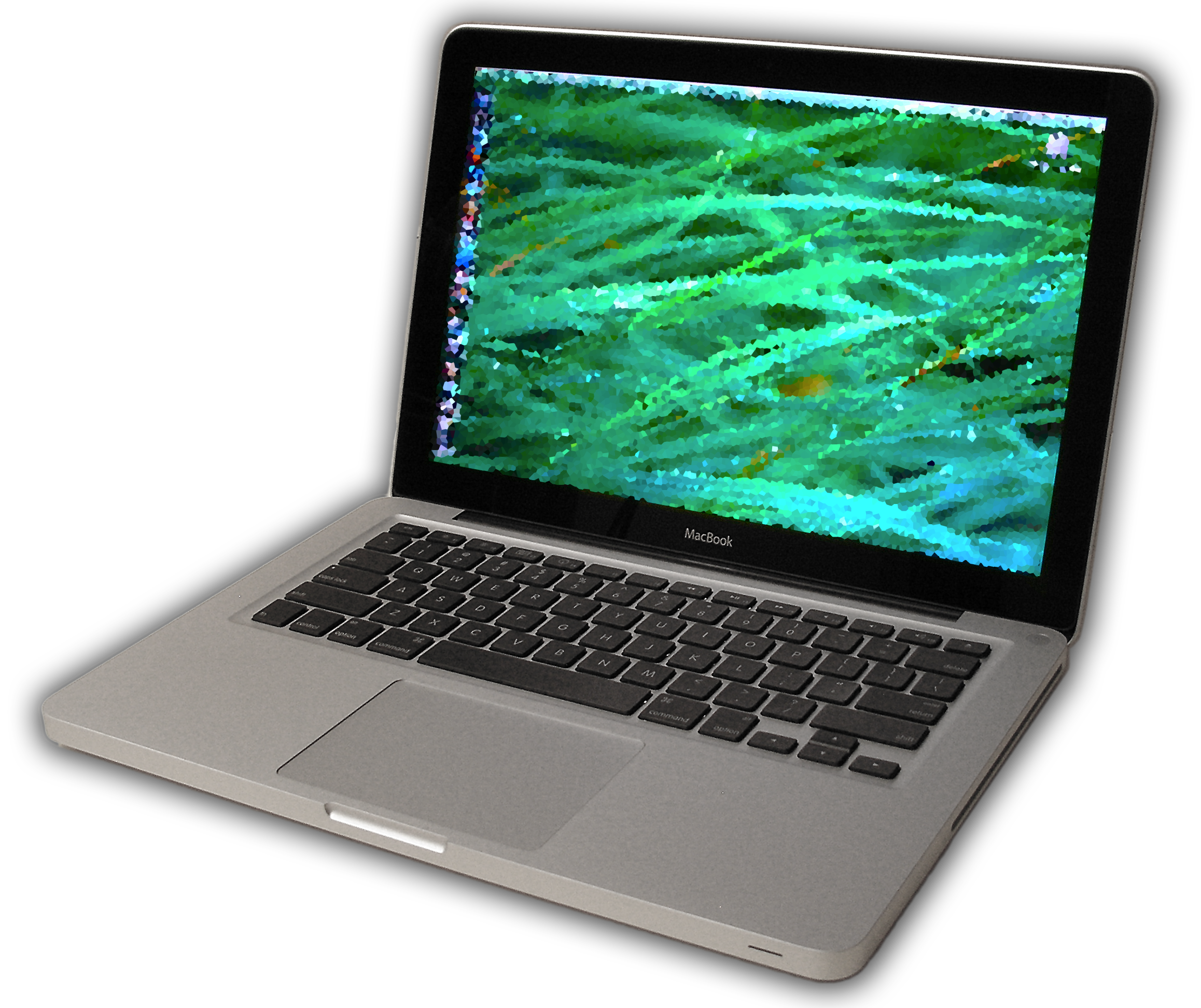
MacBook Aluminum Unibody, launched June 8, 2009

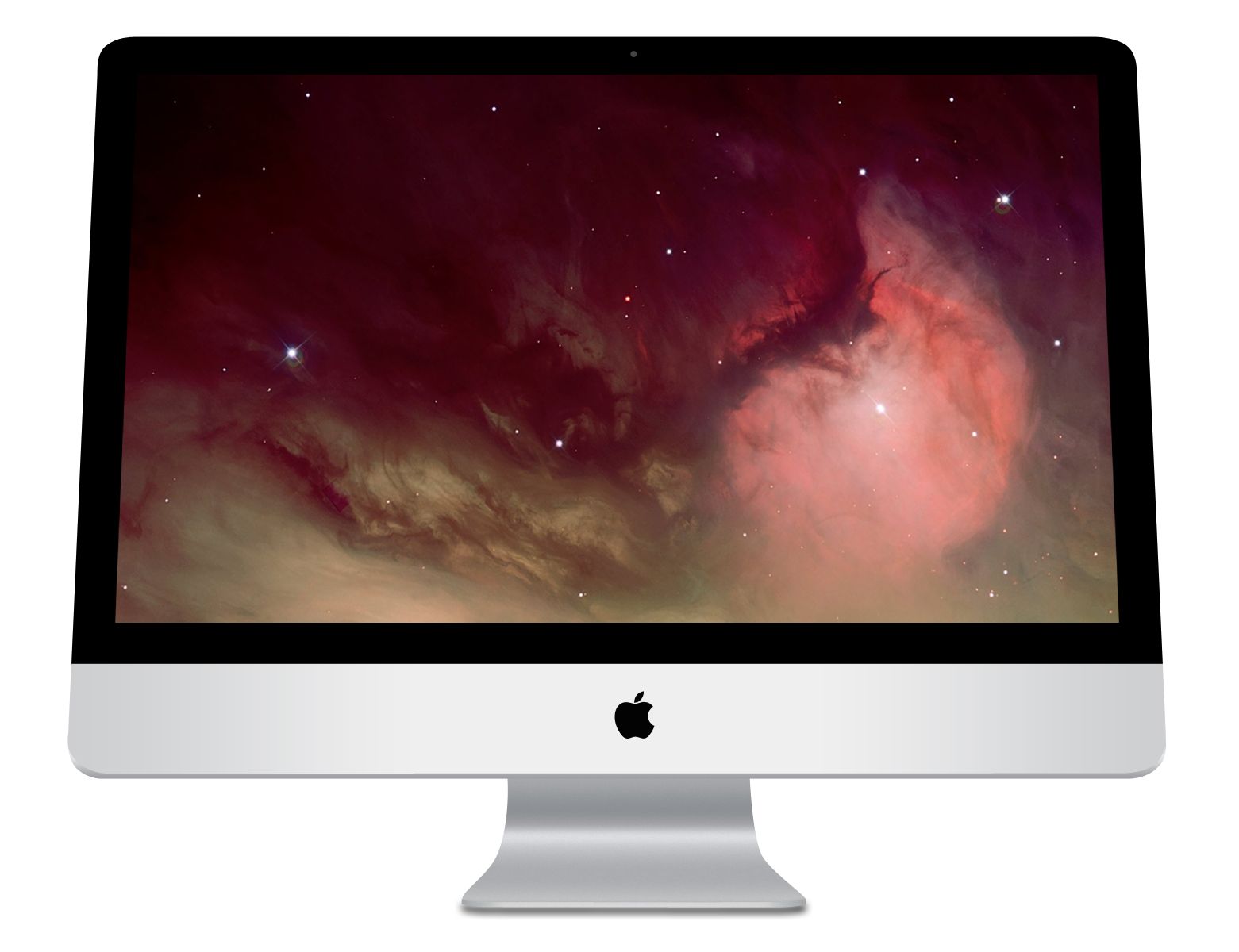
iMac Unibody, the third generation of Intel-based iMacs, launched October 20, 2009

Year	Launched	Model	Family	Discontinued
2000	February 16, 2000	PowerBook FireWire (G3 "Pismo")	PowerBook G3	January 9, 2001
2000	February 16, 2000	iBook SE	iBook	September 13, 2000
2000	July 19, 2000	Power Mac G4 Cube	Power Macintosh	July 3, 2001
2000	July 19, 2000	iMac G3 (Summer 2000)	iMac	February 22, 2001
2000	September 13, 2000	iBook (FireWire)	iBook	May 1, 2001
2001	January 7, 2001	PowerBook G4 Titanium	PowerBook G4	September 16, 2003
2001	January 9, 2001	Power Mac G4 (Digital Audio)	Power Macintosh	August 13, 2002
2001	February 22, 2001	iMac G3 (Early 2001)	iMac	July 18, 2001
2001	May 1, 2001	iBook G3 "Snow" 12" (Mid 2001)	iBook	October 16, 2001
2001	July 18, 2001	iMac G3 (Summer 2001)	iMac	March 18, 2003
2001	July 18, 2001	Power Mac G4 Quicksilver	Power Macintosh	August 13, 2002
2001	September 8, 2001	Macintosh Server G4 Quicksilver	Workgroup Server	May 14, 2002
2001	October 16, 2001	iBook G3 "Snow" 12" (Late 2001)	iBook	May 20, 2002
2002	January 1, 2002	iMac G4 15"	iMac	February 4, 2003
2002	January 1, 2002	iBook G3 "Snow" 14" (Early 2002)	iBook	May 20, 2002
2002	April 29, 2002	eMac G4/700	eMac	May 6, 2003
2002	May 14, 2002	Xserve G4	Xserve	February 10, 2003
2002	May 20, 2002	iBook G3 "Snow" (Mid 2002)	iBook	November 6, 2002
2002	August 1, 2002	iMac G4 17"	iMac	February 4, 2003
2002	August 13, 2002	Power Mac G4 MDD	Power Macintosh	June 9, 2004
2002	August 13, 2002	eMac G4/800	eMac	May 6, 2003
2002	August 27, 2002	Macintosh Server G4 MDD	Workgroup Server	January 28, 2003
2002	November 6, 2002	iBook G3 "Snow" (Late 2002)	iBook	April 22, 2003
2003	January 7, 2003	PowerBook G4 Aluminum 12"	PowerBook G4	May 16, 2006
2003	January 7, 2003	PowerBook G4 Aluminum 17"	PowerBook G4	April 24, 2006
2003	February 4, 2003	iMac G4 800 15"	iMac	September 8, 2003
2003	February 4, 2003	iMac G4 1.0 17"	iMac	September 8, 2003
2003	February 10, 2003	Xserve G4 (Slot Load)	Xserve	January 6, 2004
2003	February 10, 2003	Xserve G4 Cluster Node	Xserve	January 6, 2004
2003	April 22, 2003	iBook G3 "Snow" (Early 2003)	iBook	October 22, 2003
2003	May 6, 2003	eMac G4/800 (ATI)	eMac	October 22, 2003
2003	May 6, 2003	eMac G4/1.0 (ATI)	eMac	April 13, 2004
2003	June 23, 2003	Power Mac G5	Power Macintosh	June 9, 2004
2003	September 8, 2003	iMac G4 15" (USB 2.0)	iMac	July 1, 2004
2003	September 8, 2003	iMac G4 17" (USB 2.0)	iMac	July 1, 2004
2003	September 16, 2003	PowerBook G4 Aluminum 15"	PowerBook G4	February 14, 2006
2003	October 22, 2003	iBook G4 (Late 2003)	iBook	April 19, 2004
2003	November 18, 2003	iMac G4 20"	iMac	July 1, 2004
2004	January 6, 2004	Xserve G5	Xserve	August 7, 2006
2004	January 6, 2004	Xserve G5 Cluster Node	Xserve	August 7, 2006
2004	April 13, 2004	eMac (USB 2.0)	eMac	May 3, 2005
2004	April 19, 2004	iBook G4 (Early 2004)	iBook	October 19, 2004
2004	June 9, 2004	Power Mac G5 (June 2004)	Power Macintosh	April 27, 2005
2004	August 31, 2004	iMac G5	iMac	May 3, 2005
2004	October 19, 2004	iBook G4 (Late 2004)	iBook	July 26, 2005
2004	October 19, 2004	Power Mac G5 (Late 2004)	Power Macintosh	June 13, 2005
2005	January 11, 2005	Mac Mini (Early 2005)	Mac Mini	July 26, 2005
2005	April 27, 2005	Power Mac G5 (Early 2005)	Power Macintosh	October 19, 2005
2005	May 3, 2005	eMac (2005)	eMac	October 12, 2005
2005	May 3, 2005	iMac G5 Ambient Light Sensor	iMac	October 12, 2005
2005	June 6, 2005	Developer Transition Kit (2005)	Power Macintosh	December 31, 2006
2005	July 26, 2005	iBook G4 (Mid 2005)	iBook	May 16, 2006
2005	July 26, 2005	Mac Mini (Mid 2005)	Mac Mini	September 27, 2005
2005	September 27, 2005	Mac Mini (Late 2005)	Mac Mini	February 28, 2006
2005	October 12, 2005	iMac G5 iSight	iMac	January 10, 2006
2005	October 19, 2005	Power Mac G5 (Late 2005)	Power Macintosh	August 7, 2006
2006	January 10, 2006	iMac Polycarbonate (Early 2006)	iMac	September 6, 2006
2006	February 14, 2006	MacBook Pro Aluminum 15" (Early 2006)	MacBook Pro	February 26, 2008
2006	February 28, 2006	Mac Mini (Early 2006)	Mac Mini	September 6, 2006
2006	April 24, 2006	MacBook Pro Aluminum 17" (Early 2006)	MacBook Pro	February 26, 2008
2006	May 16, 2006	MacBook Polycarbonate (Mid 2006)	MacBook	November 8, 2008
2006	July 5, 2006	iMac Polycarbonate (Mid 2006)	iMac	September 6, 2006
2006	August 7, 2006	Mac Pro Tower (Mid 2006)	Mac Pro	January 8, 2008
2006	August 7, 2006	Xserve (Late 2006)	Xserve	January 8, 2008
2006	September 6, 2006	iMac Polycarbonate (Late 2006)	iMac	August 7, 2007
2006	September 6, 2006	Mac Mini (Late 2006)	Mac Mini	August 7, 2007
2006	October 24, 2006	MacBook Pro Aluminum (Late 2006)	MacBook Pro	June 5, 2007
2006	November 8, 2006	MacBook Polycarbonate (Late 2006)	MacBook	May 15, 2007
2007	May 15, 2007	MacBook Polycarbonate (Mid 2007)	MacBook	November 1, 2007
2007	June 5, 2007	MacBook Pro Aluminum (Mid 2007)	MacBook Pro	November 1, 2007
2007	August 7, 2007	iMac Aluminum (Mid 2007)	iMac	April 28, 2008
2007	August 7, 2007	Mac Mini (Mid 2007)	Mac Mini	March 3, 2009
2007	November 1, 2007	MacBook Pro Aluminum (Late 2007)	MacBook Pro	February 26, 2008
2007	November 1, 2007	MacBook Polycarbonate (Late 2007)	MacBook	February 26, 2008
2008	January 8, 2008	Xserve (Early 2008)	Xserve	April 7, 2009
2008	January 8, 2008	Mac Pro Tower (Early 2008)	Mac Pro	March 3, 2009
2008	January 15, 2008	MacBook Air Unibody (Early 2008)	MacBook Air	October 14, 2008
2008	February 26, 2008	MacBook Polycarbonate (Early 2008)	MacBook	October 14, 2008
2008	February 26, 2008	MacBook Pro Aluminum 15" (Early 2008)	MacBook Pro	October 14, 2008
2008	February 26, 2008	MacBook Pro Aluminum 17" (Early 2008)	MacBook Pro	January 6, 2009
2008	April 28, 2008	iMac Aluminum (Early 2008)	iMac	March 3, 2009
2008	October 14, 2008	MacBook Air Unibody (Late 2008)	MacBook Air	June 8, 2009
2008	October 14, 2008	MacBook Polycarbonate White (Late 2008)	MacBook	January 29, 2009
2008	October 14, 2008	MacBook Aluminum Unibody (Late 2008)	MacBook	June 8, 2009
2008	October 14, 2008	MacBook Pro Aluminum (Late 2008)	MacBook Pro	June 8, 2009
2008	October 14, 2008	MacBook Pro Unibody (Late 2008)	MacBook Pro	June 8, 2009
2009	January 6, 2009	MacBook Pro Unibody 17" (Early 2009)	MacBook Pro	June 8, 2009
2009	January 29, 2009	MacBook Polycarbonate White (Early 2009)	MacBook	May 27, 2009
2009	March 3, 2009	iMac Aluminum (Early 2009)	iMac	October 20, 2009
2009	March 3, 2009	Mac Mini (Early 2009)	Mac Mini	October 20, 2009
2009	March 3, 2009	Mac Pro Tower (Early 2009)	Mac Pro	August 9, 2010
2009	March 3, 2009	MacBook Pro Unibody 15" (Early 2009)	MacBook Pro	June 8, 2009
2009	April 7, 2009	iMac Aluminum (Mid 2009)	iMac	March 4, 2010
2009	April 7, 2009	Xserve (Early 2009)	Xserve	January 31, 2011
2009	May 27, 2009	MacBook Polycarbonate White (Mid 2009)	MacBook	October 20, 2009
2009	June 8, 2009	MacBook Air Unibody (Mid 2009)	MacBook Air	September 1, 2010
2009	June 8, 2009	MacBook Pro Unibody (Mid 2009)	MacBook Pro	April 13, 2010
2009	October 20, 2009	iMac Unibody (Late 2009)	iMac	July 27, 2010
2009	October 20, 2009	Mac Mini (Late 2009)	Mac Mini	June 15, 2010
2009	October 20, 2009	Mac Mini Server (Late 2009)	Mac Mini	June 15, 2010
2009	October 20, 2009	MacBook Polycarbonate Unibody (Late 2009)	MacBook	May 18, 2010

=== 2010s ===
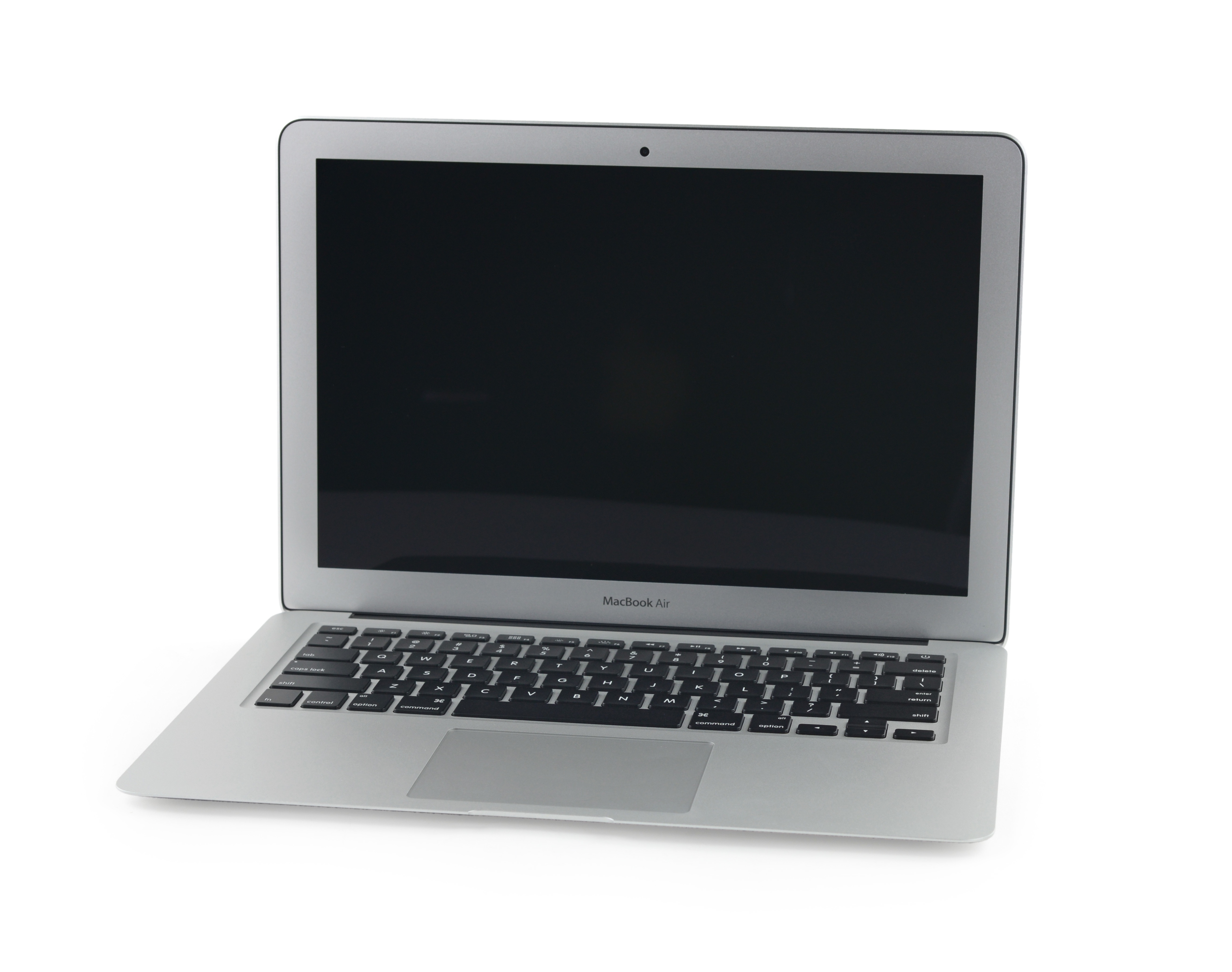
MacBook Air Tapered Unibody, launched October 20, 2010

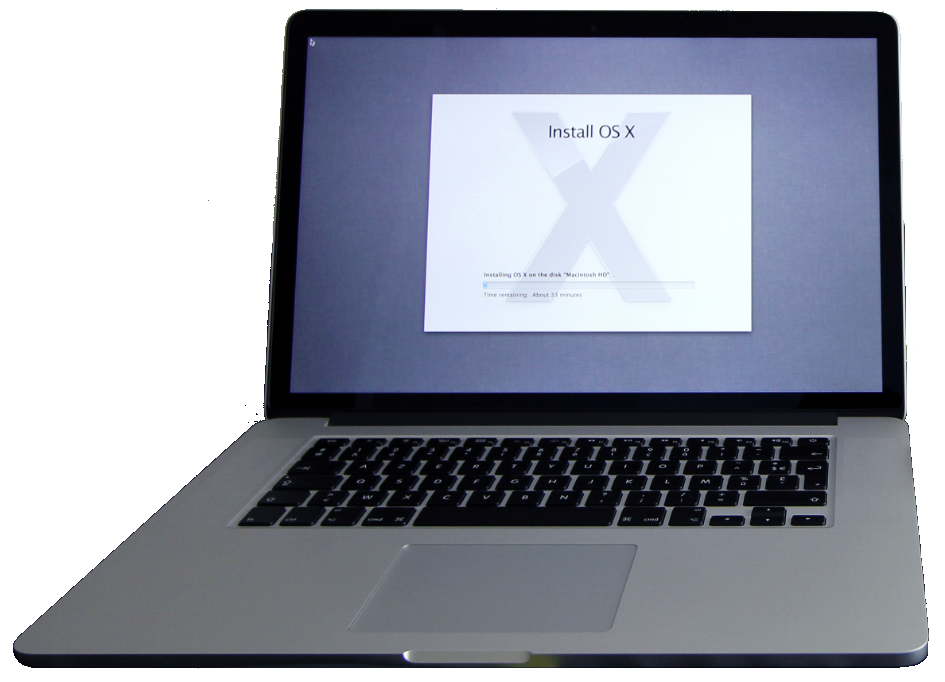
MacBook Pro Retina, launched June 11, 2012

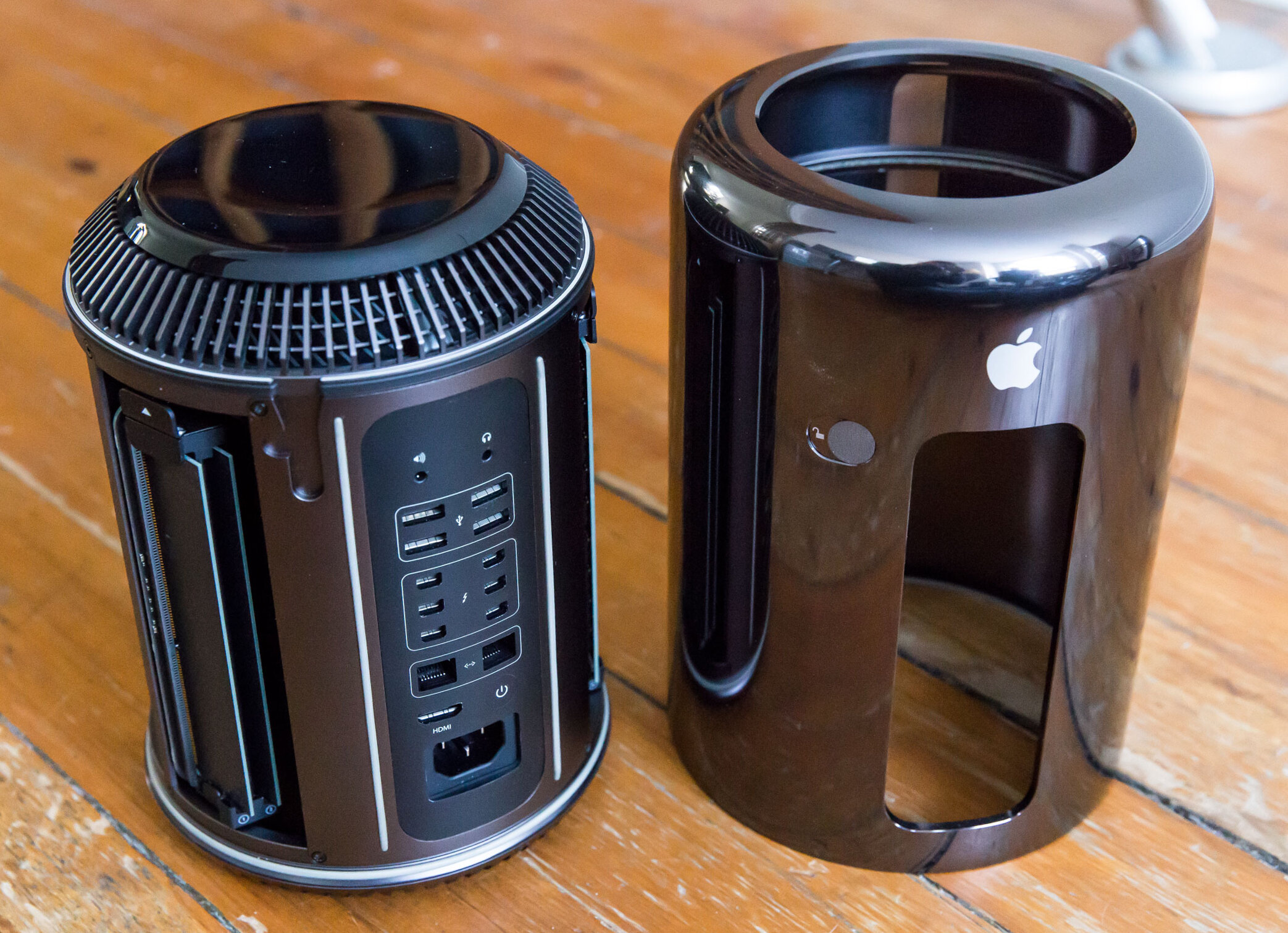
Mac Pro (Cylinder), launched December 19, 2013

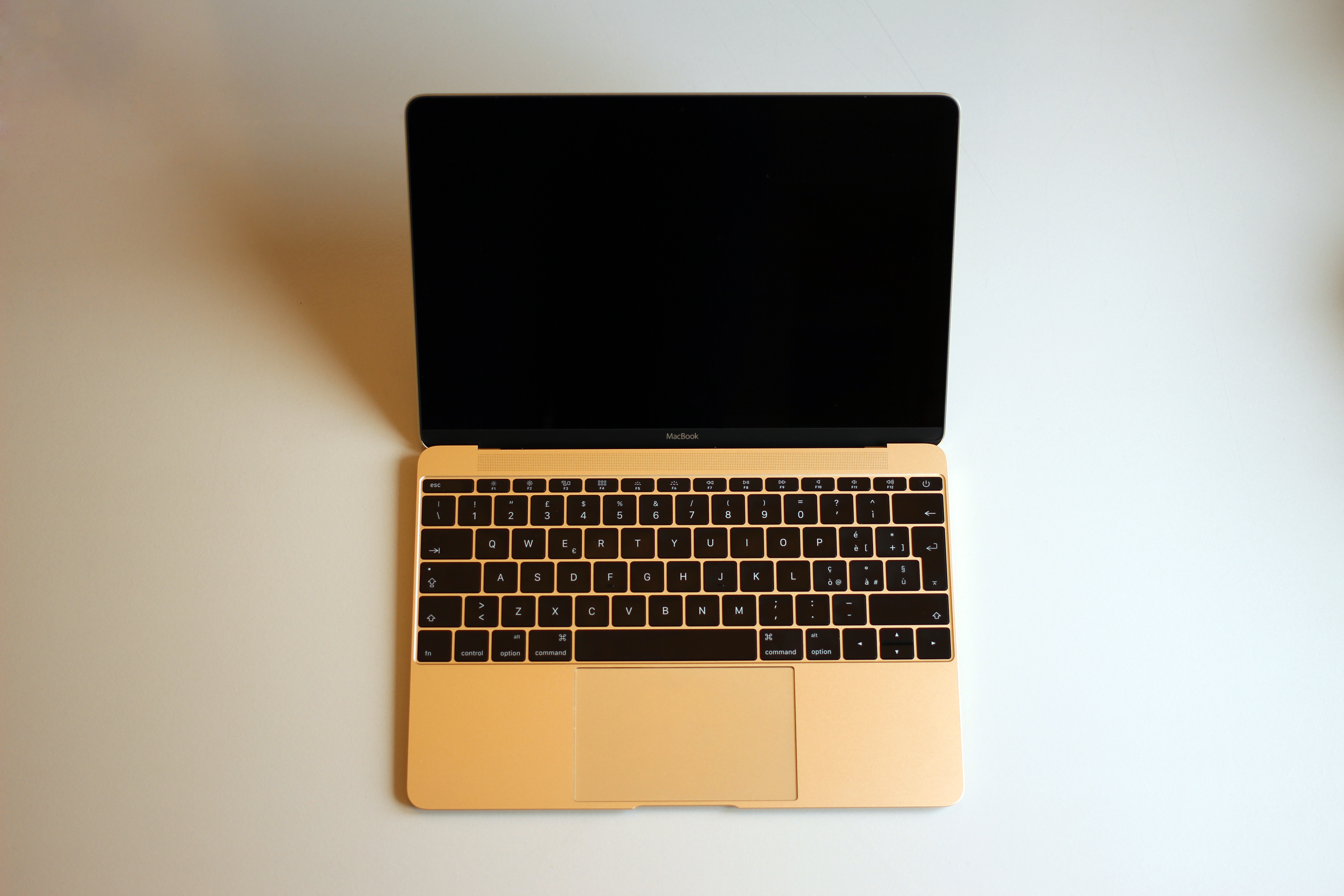
MacBook Retina, launched April 10, 2015

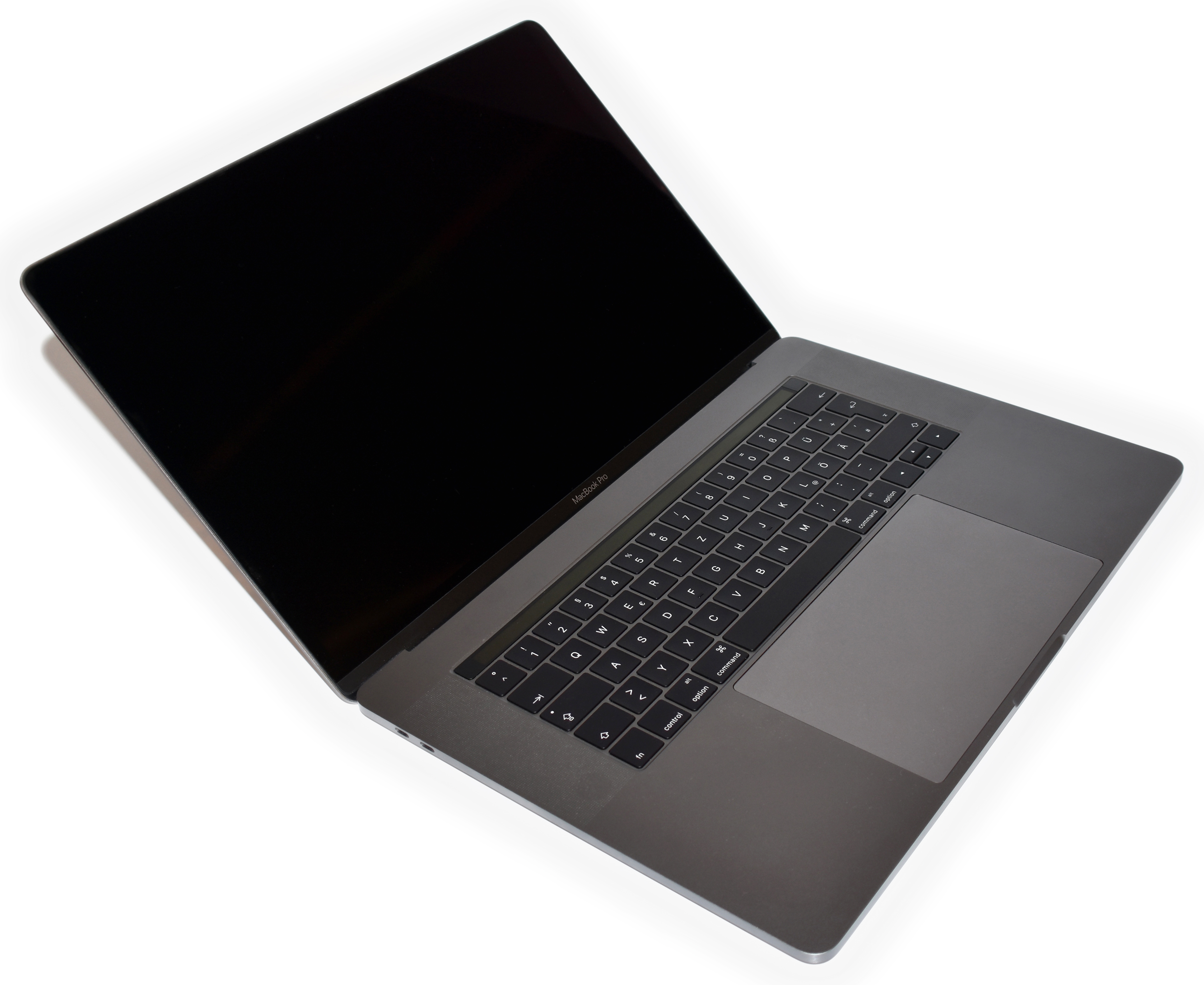
MacBook Pro with Touch Bar, launched October 27, 2016

iMac Pro, launched December 14, 2017

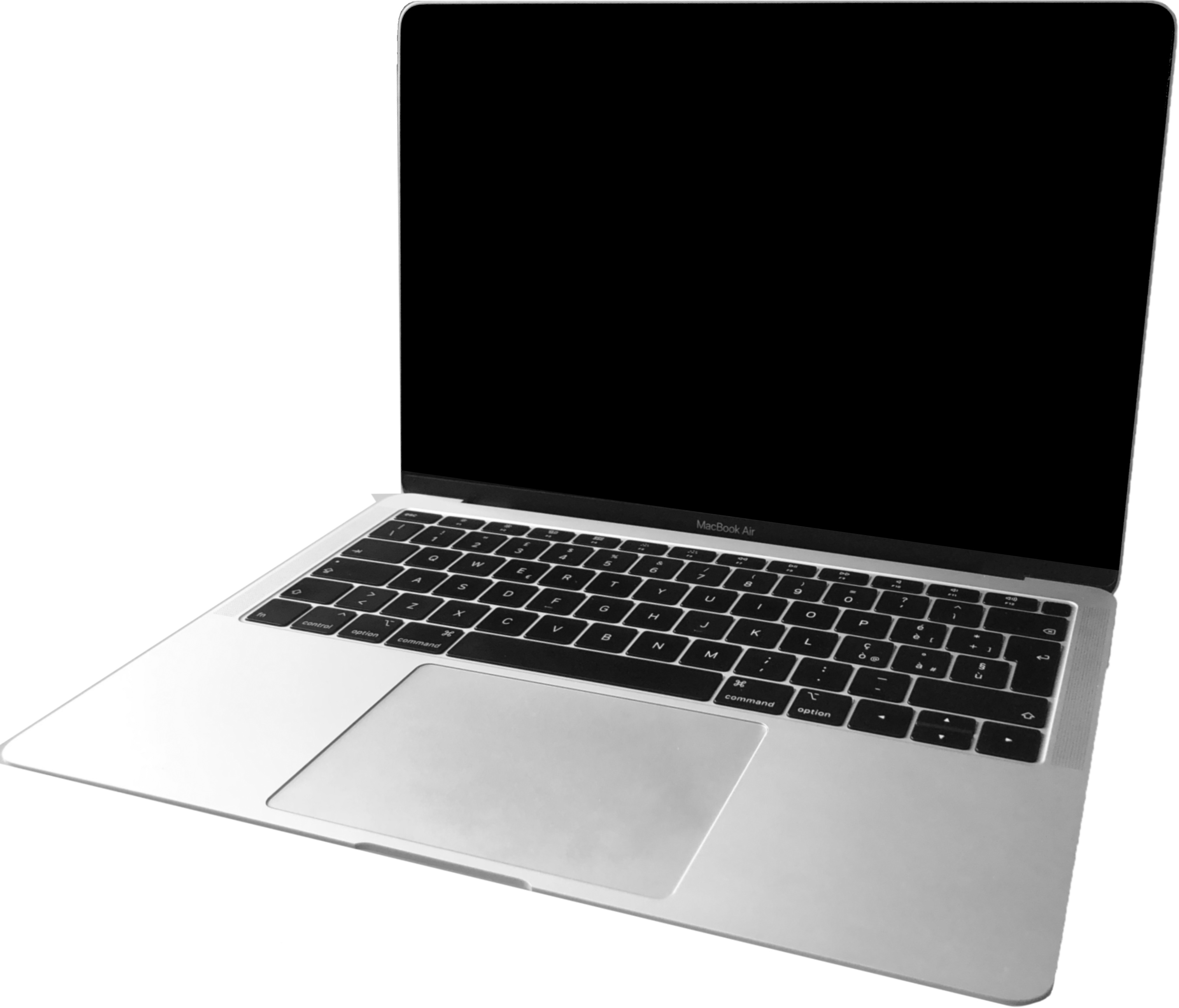
MacBook Air Retina, launched October 30, 2018

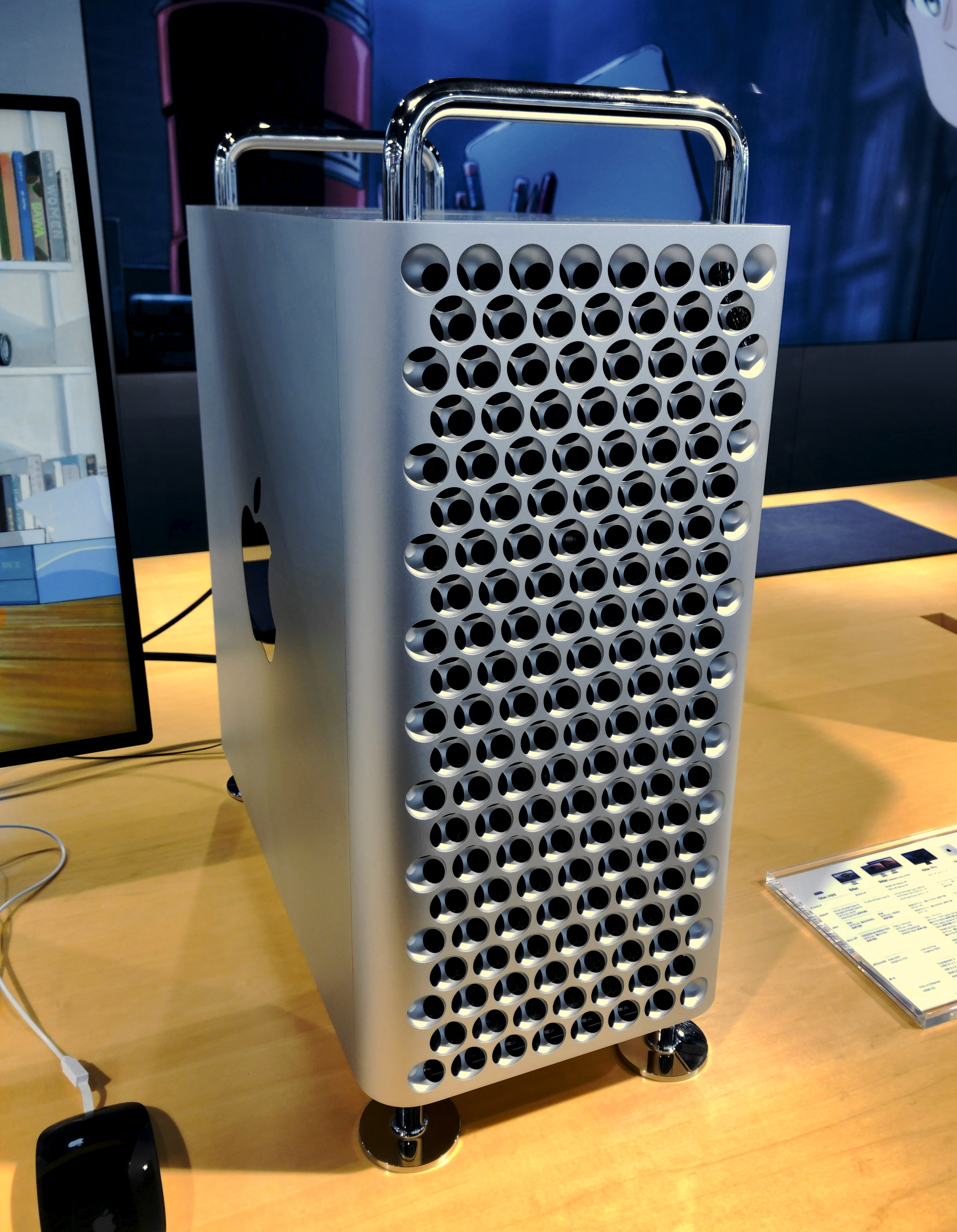
Mac Pro (Lattice tower), launched December 10, 2019

Year	Launched	Model	Family	Discontinued
2010	April 13, 2010	MacBook Pro (Mid 2010)	MacBook Pro	February 24, 2011
2010	May 18, 2010	MacBook (Mid 2010)	MacBook	July 20, 2011
2010	June 15, 2010	Mac Mini (Mid 2010)	Mac Mini	July 20, 2011
2010	June 15, 2010	Mac Mini Server (Mid 2010)	Mac Mini	July 20, 2011
2010	July 27, 2010	iMac (Mid 2010)	iMac	May 3, 2011
2010	August 9, 2010	Mac Pro (Mid 2010)	Mac Pro	June 11, 2012
2010	October 20, 2010	MacBook Air (Late 2010)	MacBook Air	July 20, 2011
2011	February 24, 2011	MacBook Pro (Early 2011)	MacBook Pro	October 24, 2011
2011	May 3, 2011	iMac (Mid 2011)	iMac	October 23, 2012
2011	July 20, 2011	MacBook Air (Mid 2011)	MacBook Air	June 11, 2012
2011	July 20, 2011	Mac Mini (Mid 2011)	Mac Mini	October 23, 2012
2011	July 20, 2011	Mac Mini Server (Mid 2011)	Mac Mini	October 23, 2012
2011	August 8, 2011	iMac (21.5-inch, Late 2011)	iMac	March 5, 2013
2011	October 24, 2011	MacBook Pro (Late 2011)	MacBook Pro	June 11, 2012
2012	June 11, 2012	Mac Pro (Mid 2012)	Mac Pro	December 19, 2013
2012	June 11, 2012	MacBook Air (Mid 2012)	MacBook Air	June 10, 2013
2012	June 11, 2012	MacBook Pro (13-inch, Mid 2012)	MacBook Pro	October 27, 2016
2012	June 11, 2012	MacBook Pro (15-inch, Mid 2012)	MacBook Pro	October 22, 2013
2012	June 11, 2012	MacBook Pro (Retina, Mid 2012)	MacBook Pro	February 13, 2013
2012	October 23, 2012	Mac Mini (Late 2012)	Mac Mini	October 16, 2014
2012	October 23, 2012	Mac Mini Server (Late 2012)	Mac Mini	October 16, 2014
2012	October 23, 2012	MacBook Pro (Retina, 13-inch, Late 2012)	MacBook Pro	October 22, 2013
2012	November 30, 2012	iMac (Late 2012)	iMac	October 23, 2013
2013	February 13, 2013	MacBook Pro (Retina, Early 2013)	MacBook Pro	October 22, 2013
2013	March 5, 2013	iMac (21.5-inch, Early 2013)	iMac	September 24, 2013
2013	June 10, 2013	MacBook Air (Mid 2013)	MacBook Air	April 29, 2014
2013	September 24, 2013	iMac (Late 2013)	iMac	June 18, 2014
2013	October 22, 2013	MacBook Pro (Retina, Late 2013)	MacBook Pro	July 29, 2014
2013	December 19, 2013	Mac Pro (Late 2013)	Mac Pro	June 3, 2019
2014	April 29, 2014	MacBook Air (Early 2014)	MacBook Air	March 9, 2015
2014	June 18, 2014	iMac (21.5-inch, Mid 2014)	iMac	October 13, 2015
2014	July 29, 2014	MacBook Pro (Retina, 13-inch, Mid 2014)	MacBook Pro	March 9, 2015
2014	July 29, 2014	MacBook Pro (Retina, 15-inch, Mid 2014)	MacBook Pro	May 19, 2015
2014	October 16, 2014	iMac (Retina 5K, 27-inch, Late 2014)	iMac	October 13, 2015
2014	October 16, 2014	Mac Mini (Late 2014)	Mac Mini	October 30, 2018
2015	March 9, 2015	MacBook Air (11-inch, Early 2015)	MacBook Air	October 27, 2016
2015	March 9, 2015	MacBook Air (13-inch, Early 2015)	MacBook Air	June 5, 2017
2015	March 9, 2015	MacBook Pro (Retina, 13-inch, Early 2015)	MacBook Pro	June 5, 2017
2015	April 10, 2015	MacBook (Retina, Early 2015)	MacBook	April 19, 2016
2015	May 19, 2015	iMac (Retina 5K, 27-inch, Mid 2015)	iMac	October 13, 2015
2015	May 19, 2015	MacBook Pro (Retina, 15-inch, Mid 2015)	MacBook Pro	July 12, 2018
2015	October 13, 2015	iMac (21.5-inch, Late 2015)	iMac	June 5, 2017
2015	October 13, 2015	iMac (Retina, Late 2015)	iMac	June 5, 2017
2016	April 19, 2016	MacBook (Retina, Early 2016)	MacBook	June 5, 2017
2016	October 27, 2016	MacBook Pro (13-inch, 2016, Two Thunderbolt)	MacBook Pro	June 5, 2017
2016	November 12, 2016	MacBook Pro (13-inch, 2016, Four Thunderbolt)	MacBook Pro	June 5, 2017
2016	November 12, 2016	MacBook Pro (15-inch, 2016)	MacBook Pro	June 5, 2017
2017	June 5, 2017	MacBook (Retina, 2017)	MacBook	July 9, 2019
2017	June 5, 2017	MacBook Air (13-inch, 2017)	MacBook Air	July 9, 2019
2017	June 5, 2017	MacBook Pro (13-inch, 2017, Two Thunderbolt)	MacBook Pro	July 9, 2019
2017	June 5, 2017	MacBook Pro (13-inch, 2017, Four Thunderbolt)	MacBook Pro	July 12, 2018
2017	June 5, 2017	MacBook Pro (15-inch, 2017)	MacBook Pro	July 12, 2018
2017	June 5, 2017	iMac (21.5-inch, 2017)	iMac	October 30, 2021
2017	June 5, 2017	iMac (Retina, 2017)	iMac	March 19, 2019
2017	December 14, 2017	iMac Pro	iMac	March 5, 2021
2018	July 12, 2018	MacBook Pro (13-inch, 2018, Four Thunderbolt)	MacBook Pro	May 21, 2019
2018	July 12, 2018	MacBook Pro (15-inch, 2018)	MacBook Pro	May 21, 2019
2018	October 30, 2018	Mac Mini (2018)	Mac Mini	January 17, 2023
2018	October 30, 2018	MacBook Air (Retina, 13-inch, 2018)	MacBook Air	July 9, 2019
2019	March 19, 2019	iMac (Retina 4K, 21.5-inch, 2019)	iMac	April 20, 2021
2019	March 19, 2019	iMac (Retina 5K, 27-inch, 2019)	iMac	August 4, 2020
2019	May 21, 2019	MacBook Pro (15-inch, 2019)	MacBook Pro	November 13, 2019
2019	May 21, 2019	MacBook Pro (13-inch, 2019, Four Thunderbolt)	MacBook Pro	May 4, 2020
2019	July 9, 2019	MacBook Pro (13-inch, 2019, Two Thunderbolt)	MacBook Pro	May 4, 2020
2019	July 9, 2019	MacBook Air (Retina, 13-inch, 2019)	MacBook Air	March 18, 2020
2019	November 13, 2019	MacBook Pro (16-inch, 2019)	MacBook Pro	October 18, 2021
2019	December 10, 2019	Mac Pro (2019)	Mac Pro	June 5, 2023

=== 2020s ===
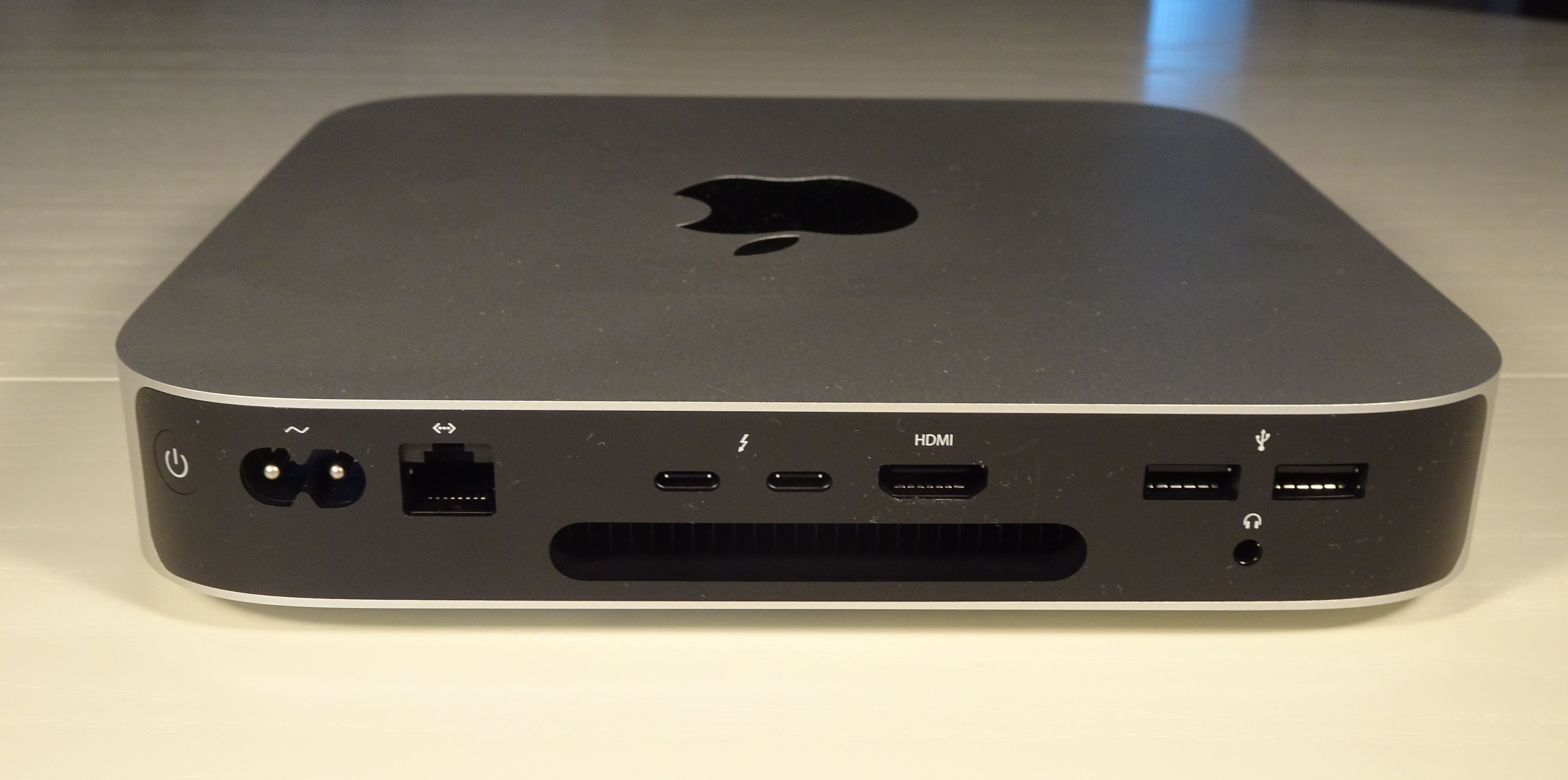
Mac Mini M1, launched November 17, 2020

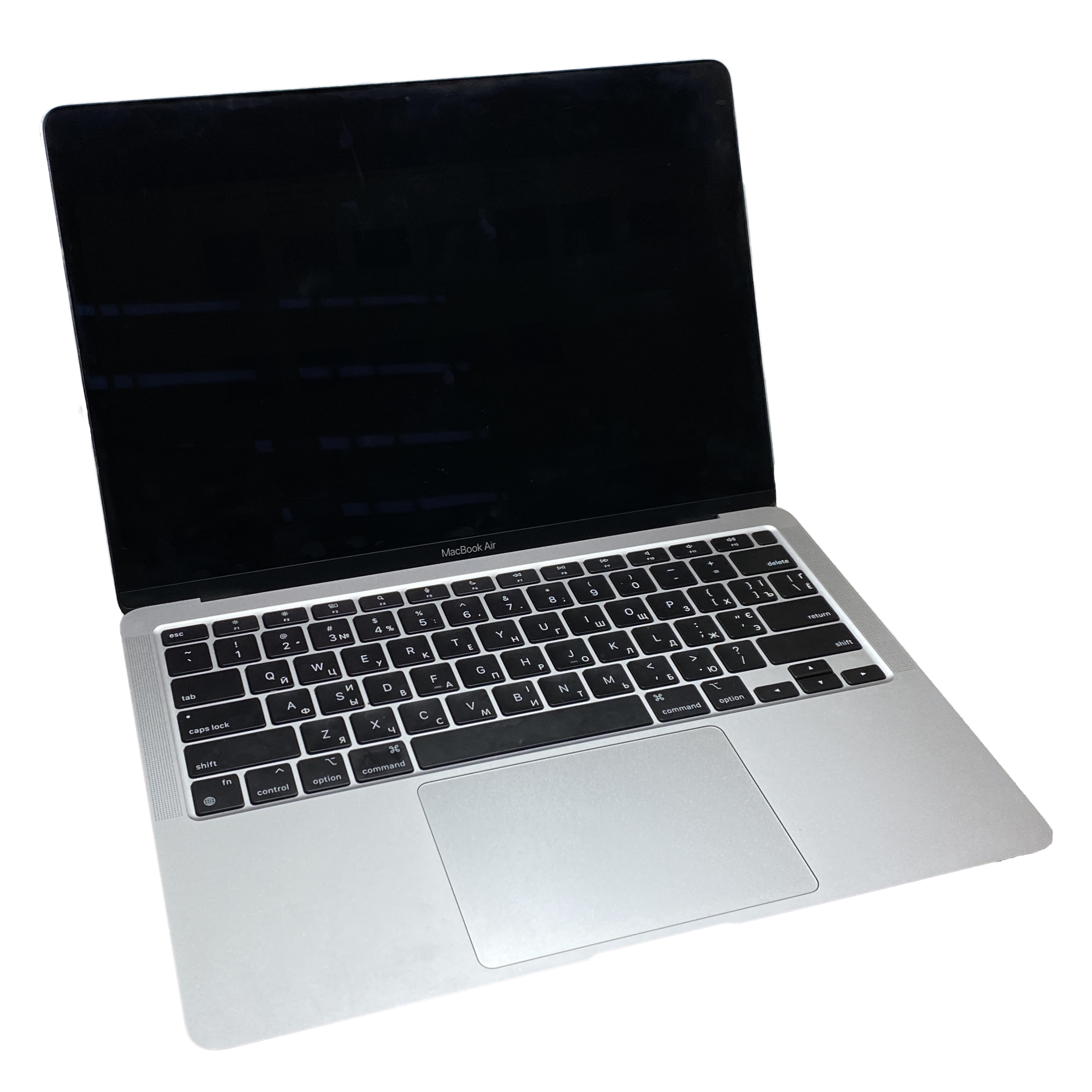
MacBook Air M1, launched November 17, 2020

iMac (M1), launched May 21, 2021

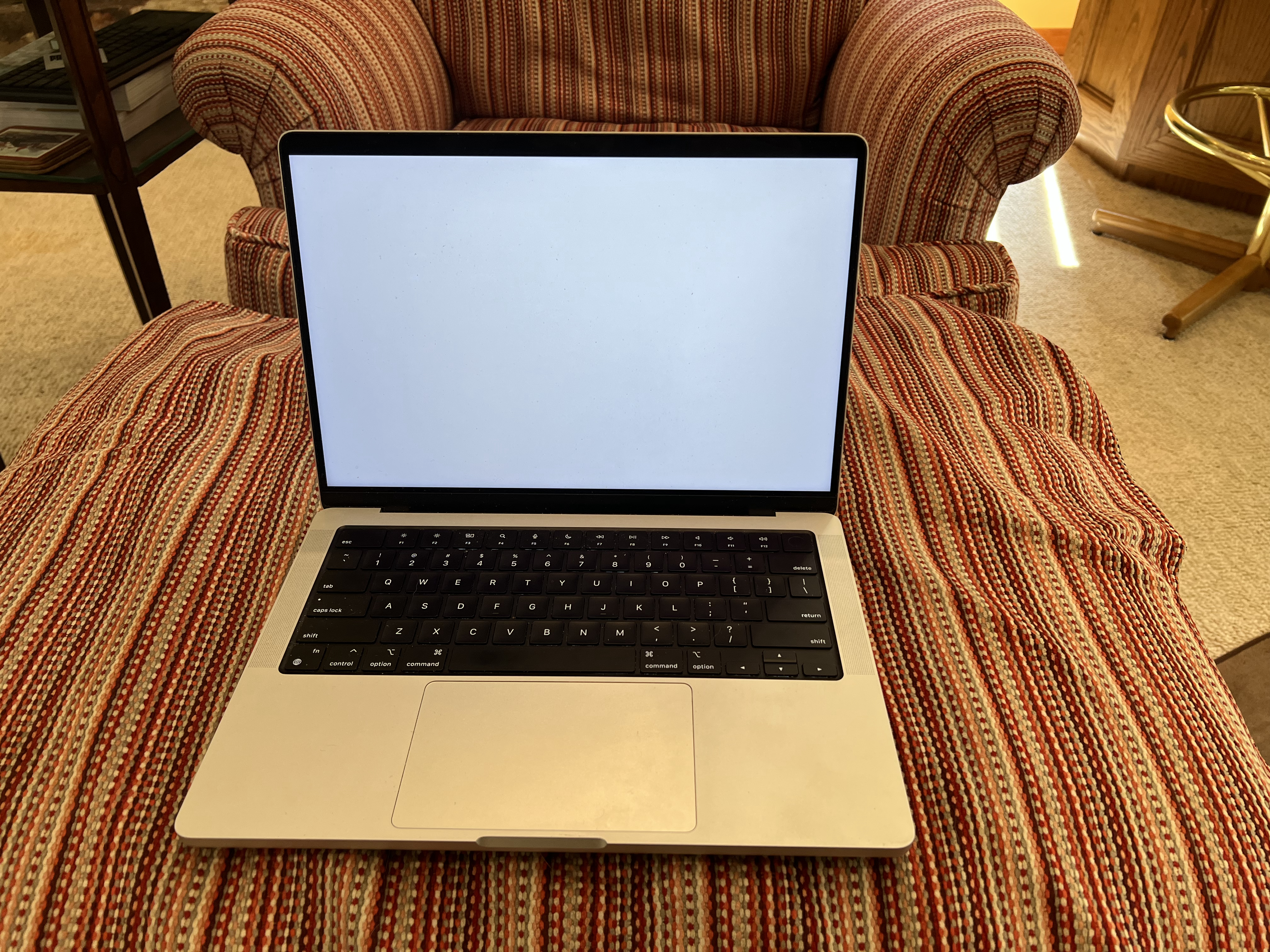
MacBook Pro (14-inch), launched October 26, 2021

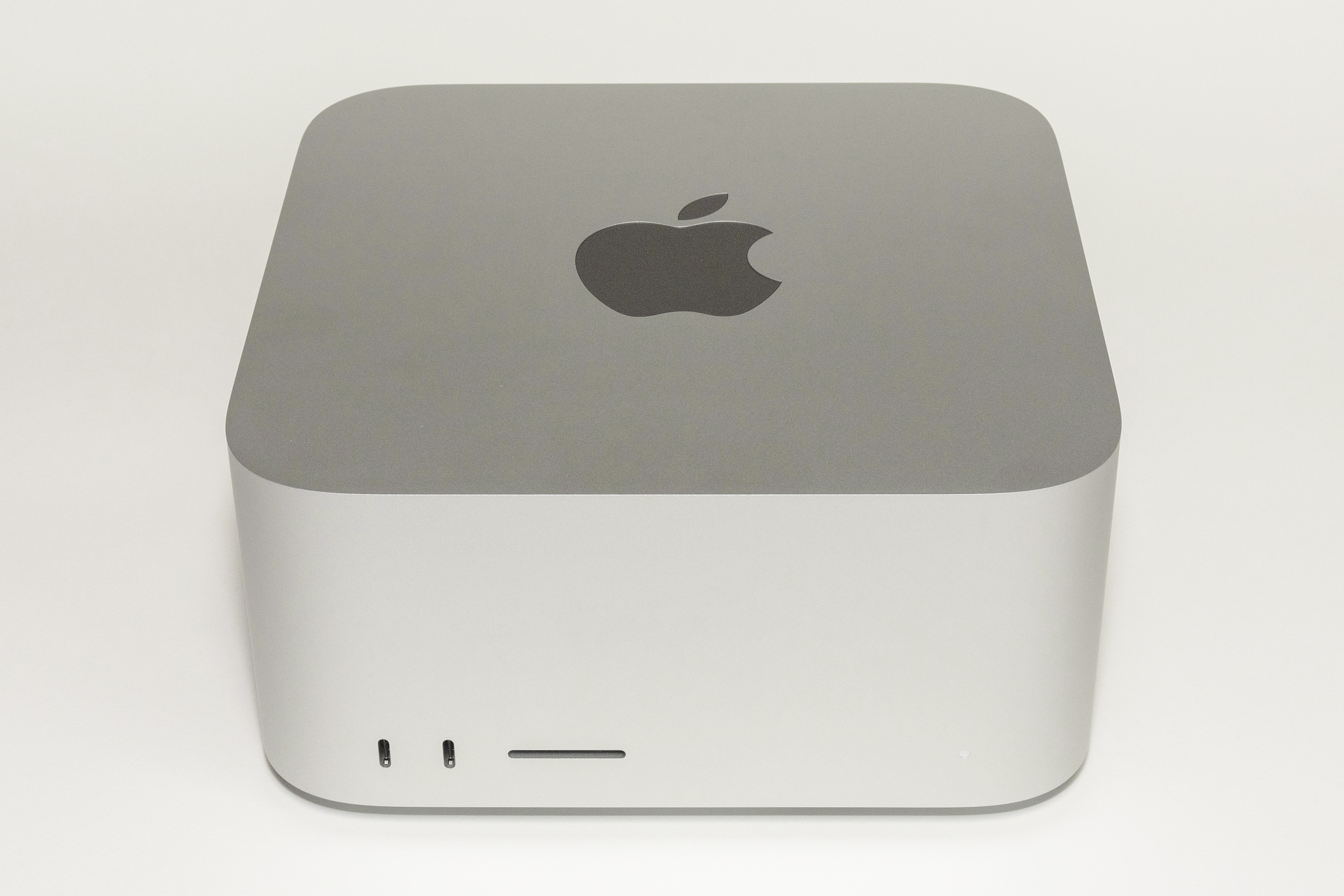
Mac Studio, launched March 18, 2022

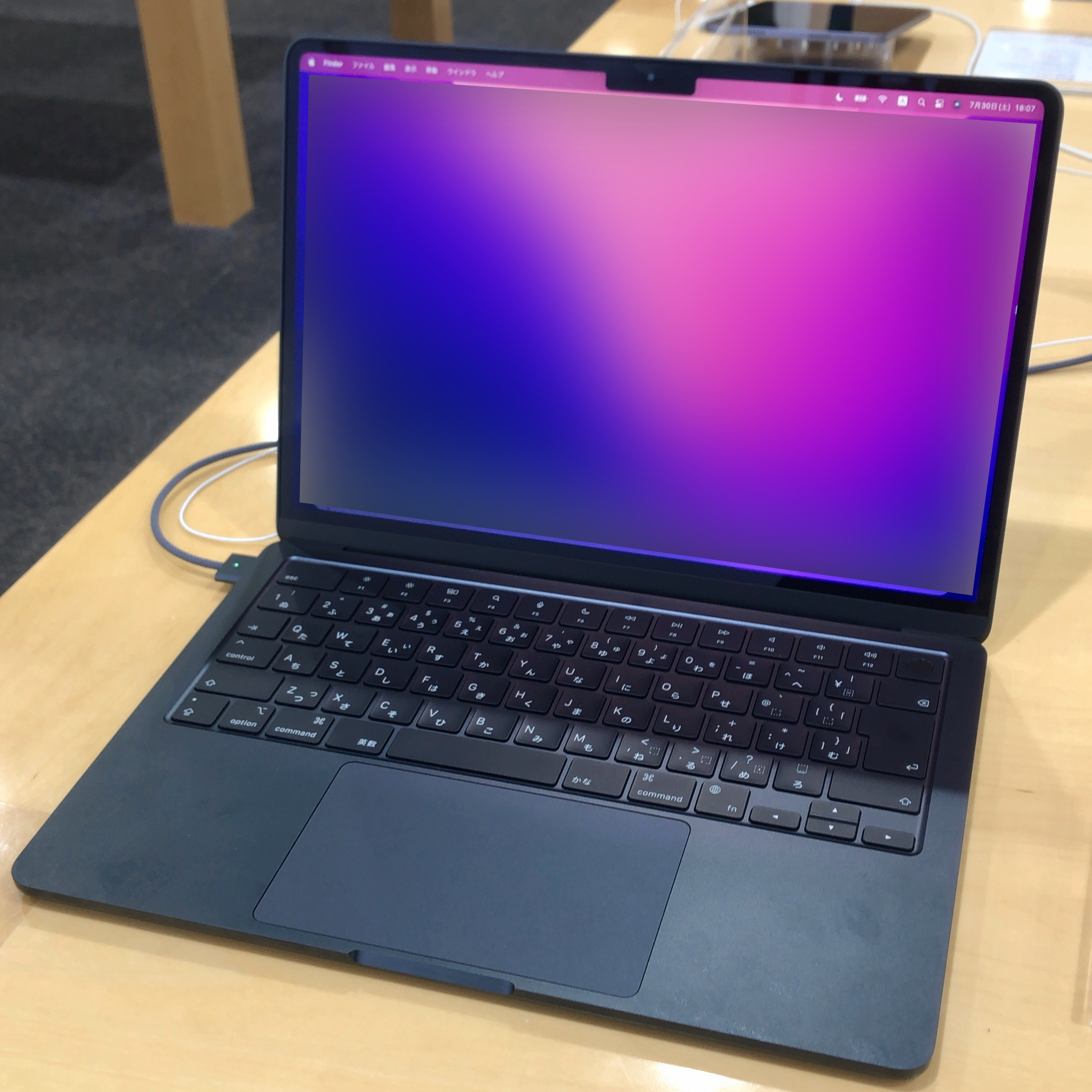
MacBook Air M2, launched July 15, 2022

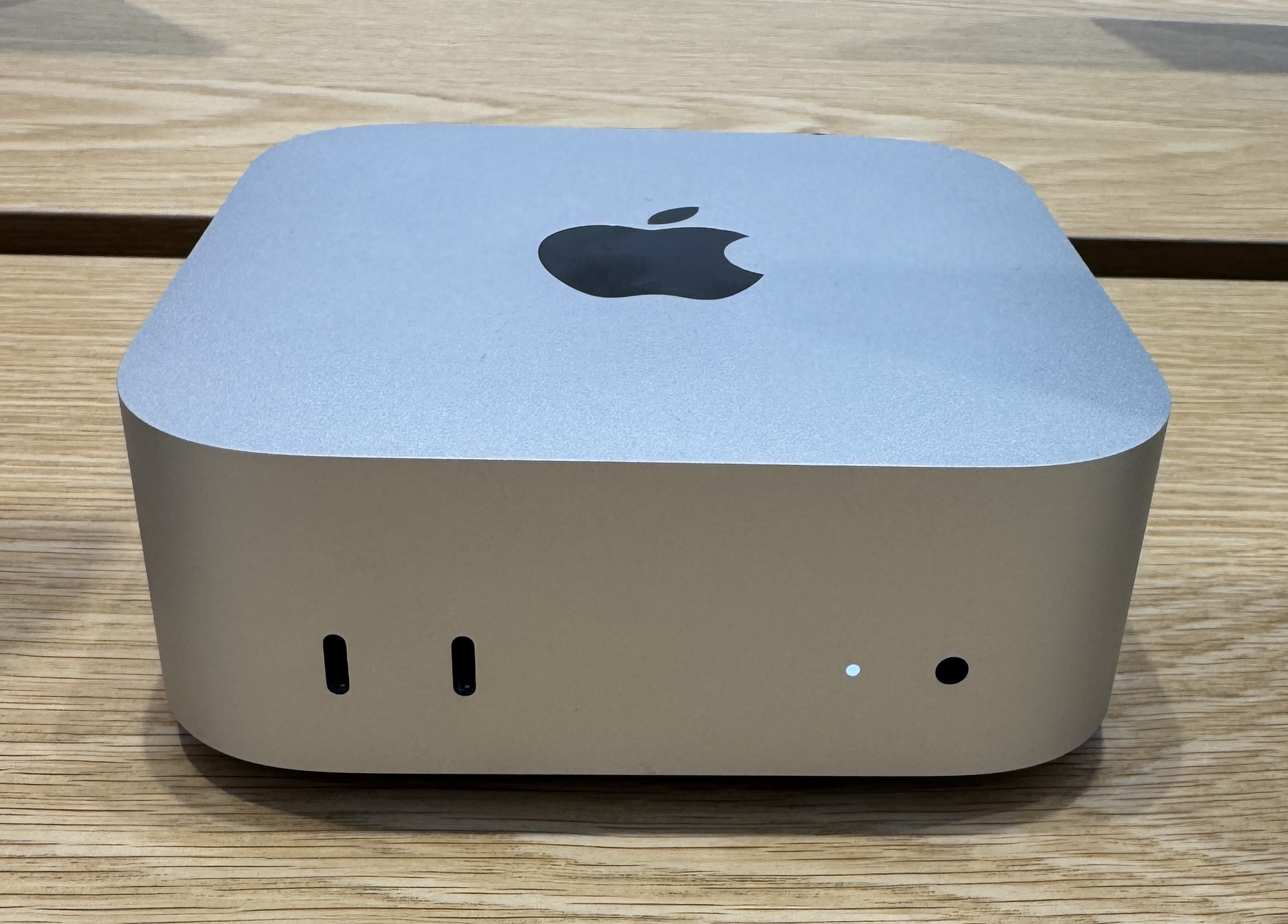
Mac Mini M4, launched November 8, 2024

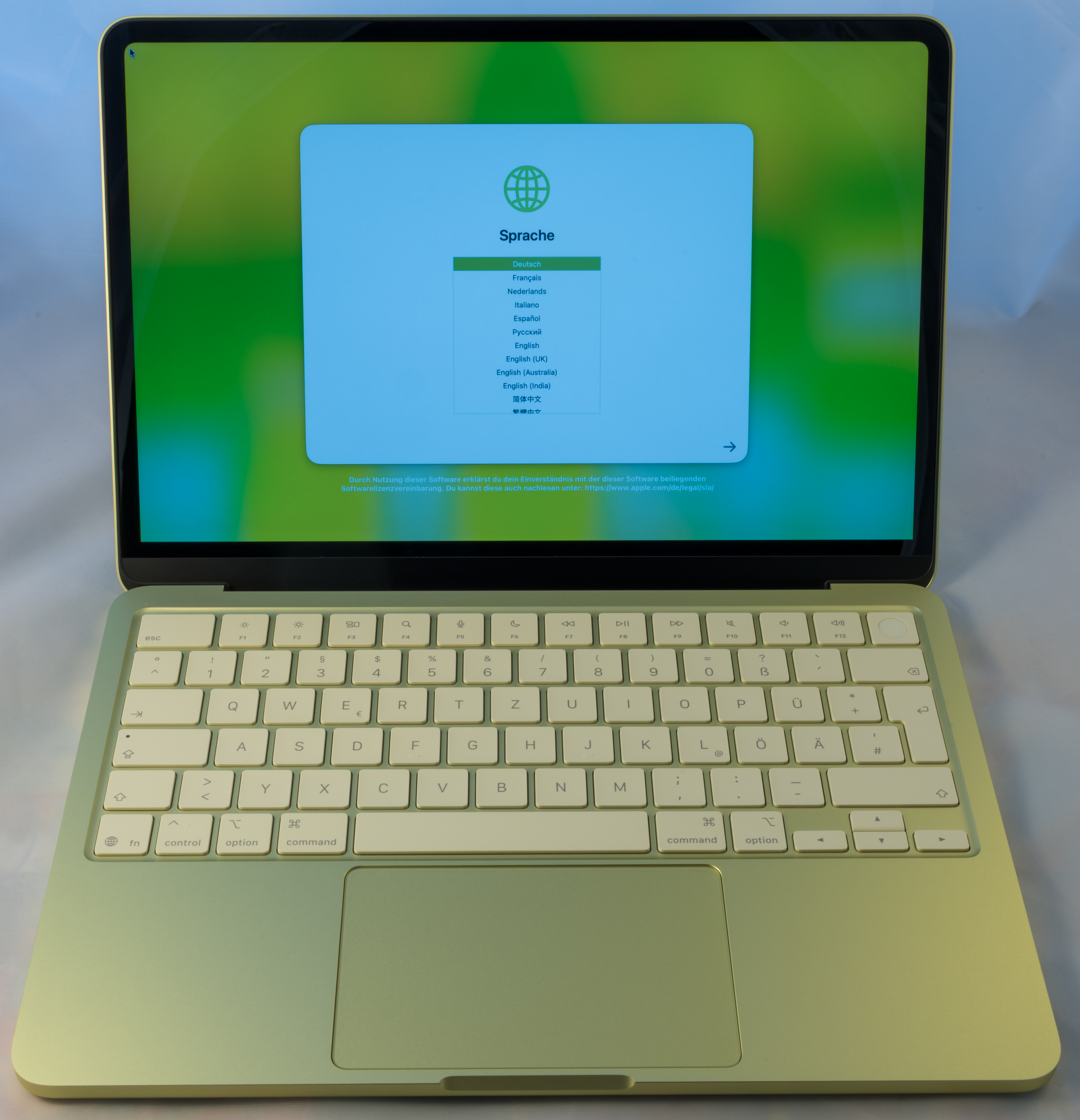
MacBook Neo, launched March 11, 2026

Year	Launched	Model	Family	Discontinued
2020	March 18, 2020	MacBook Air (Retina, 13-inch, 2020)	MacBook Air	November 10, 2020
2020	May 4, 2020	MacBook Pro (13-inch, 2020, Two Thunderbolt)	MacBook Pro	November 10, 2020
2020	May 4, 2020	MacBook Pro (13-inch, 2020, Four Thunderbolt)	MacBook Pro	October 18, 2021
2020	June 22, 2020	Developer Transition Kit (2020)	Mac Mini	February 3, 2021
2020	August 4, 2020	iMac (Retina 5K, 27-inch, 2020)	iMac	March 8, 2022
2020	November 17, 2020	Mac Mini (M1, 2020)	Mac Mini	January 17, 2023
2020	November 17, 2020	MacBook Air (M1, 2020)	MacBook Air	March 4, 2024
2020	November 17, 2020	MacBook Pro (13-inch, M1, 2020)	MacBook Pro	June 6, 2022
2021	May 21, 2021	iMac (24-inch, M1, 2021)	iMac	October 30, 2023
2021	October 26, 2021	MacBook Pro (14-inch, 2021)	MacBook Pro	January 17, 2023
2021	October 26, 2021	MacBook Pro (16-inch, 2021)	MacBook Pro	January 17, 2023
2022	March 18, 2022	Mac Studio (2022)	Mac Studio	June 5, 2023
2022	June 24, 2022	MacBook Pro (13-inch, M2, 2022)	MacBook Pro	October 30, 2023
2022	July 15, 2022	MacBook Air (M2, 2022)	MacBook Air	March 5, 2025
2023	January 24, 2023	Mac Mini (2023)	Mac Mini	October 29, 2024
2023	January 24, 2023	MacBook Pro (14-inch, 2023)	MacBook Pro	October 30, 2023
2023	January 24, 2023	MacBook Pro (16-inch, 2023)	MacBook Pro	October 30, 2023
2023	June 13, 2023	MacBook Air (15-inch, M2, 2023)	MacBook Air	March 4, 2024
2023	June 13, 2023	Mac Studio (2023)	Mac Studio	March 5, 2025
2023	June 13, 2023	Mac Pro (2023)	Mac Pro	March 26, 2026
2023	November 7, 2023	iMac (24-inch, M3, 2023)	iMac	October 28, 2024
2023	November 7, 2023	MacBook Pro (14-inch, M3, Nov 2023)	MacBook Pro	October 30, 2024
2023	November 7, 2023	MacBook Pro (14-inch, M3 Pro/Max, Nov 2023)	MacBook Pro	October 30, 2024
2023	November 7, 2023	MacBook Pro (16-inch, Nov 2023)	MacBook Pro	October 30, 2024
2024	March 8, 2024	MacBook Air (13-inch, M3, 2024)	MacBook Air	March 5, 2025
2024	March 8, 2024	MacBook Air (15-inch, M3, 2024)	MacBook Air	March 5, 2025
2024	November 8, 2024	iMac (24-inch, 2024)	iMac	October 27, 2026
2024	November 8, 2024	Mac Mini (2024)	Mac Mini	August 25, 2026
2024	November 8, 2024	MacBook Pro (14-inch, M4, 2024)	MacBook Pro	October 15, 2025
2024	November 8, 2024	MacBook Pro (14-inch, M4 Pro or M4 Max, 2024)	MacBook Pro	March 3, 2026
2024	November 8, 2024	MacBook Pro (16-inch, 2024)	MacBook Pro	March 3, 2026
2025	March 12, 2025	MacBook Air (13-inch, M4, 2025)	MacBook Air	March 3, 2026
2025	March 12, 2025	MacBook Air (15-inch, M4, 2025)	MacBook Air	March 3, 2026
2025	March 12, 2025	Mac Studio (2025)	Mac Studio	August 25, 2026
2025	October 22, 2025	MacBook Pro (14-inch, M5)	MacBook Pro	October 27, 2026
2026	March 11, 2026	MacBook Air (13-inch, M5)	MacBook Air	Current
2026	March 11, 2026	MacBook Air (15-inch, M5)	MacBook Air	Current
2026	March 11, 2026	MacBook Pro (14-inch, M5 Pro or M5 Max)	MacBook Pro	Current
2026	March 11, 2026	MacBook Pro (16-inch, M5 Pro or M5 Max)	MacBook Pro	Current
2026	March 11, 2026	MacBook Neo	MacBook Neo	Current
2026	September 22, 2026	Mac Mini (M6 or M5 Pro)	Mac Mini	Current
2026	September 22, 2026	Mac Studio (M5 Max or M5 Ultra)	Mac Studio	Current
2026	November 6, 2026	iMac (24-inch, M6)	iMac	Current
2026	November 6, 2026	MacBook Pro (14-inch, M6)	MacBook Pro	Current
2026	November 6, 2026	MacBook Pro (14-inch PROLED XDR)	MacBook Pro	Current
2026	November 6, 2026	MacBook Pro (16-inch PROLED XDR)	MacBook Pro	Current

== See also ==
- Mac (computer)
- List of Mac models grouped by CPU type
- macOS version history
- Timeline of Apple Inc. products
- Timeline of the Apple II series
