= Compatibility card =

Computer expansion card

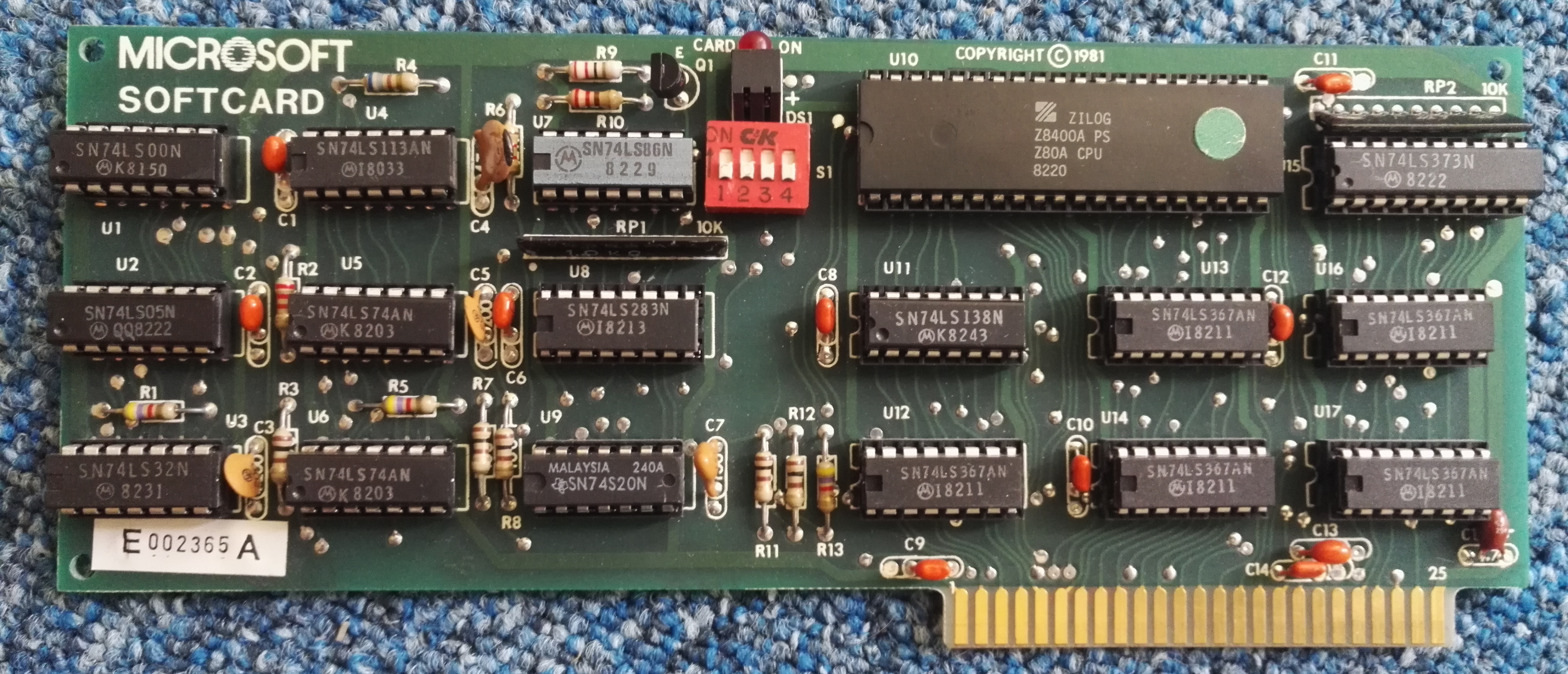
The Z-80 SoftCard, an early CP/M compatibility card for the Apple II family

A compatibility card is an expansion card for computers that allows it to have hardware emulation with another device. While compatibility cards date back at least to the Apple II family, the majority of them were made for 16-bit computers, often to maintain compatibility with the IBM PC. The most popular of these were for Macintosh systems that allowed them to emulate Windows PCs via NuBus or PCI; Apple had released several such cards themselves.

== Compatibility cards by system ==
=== Apple II ===
- The Z-80 SoftCard, manufactured by Microsoft, enabled the Apple II and Apple II Plus computers to run the CP/M operating system using an onboard Zilog Z80 processor. It was followed by the Premium SoftCard IIe for the Apple IIe computer.

=== Macintosh ===
==== By Apple ====
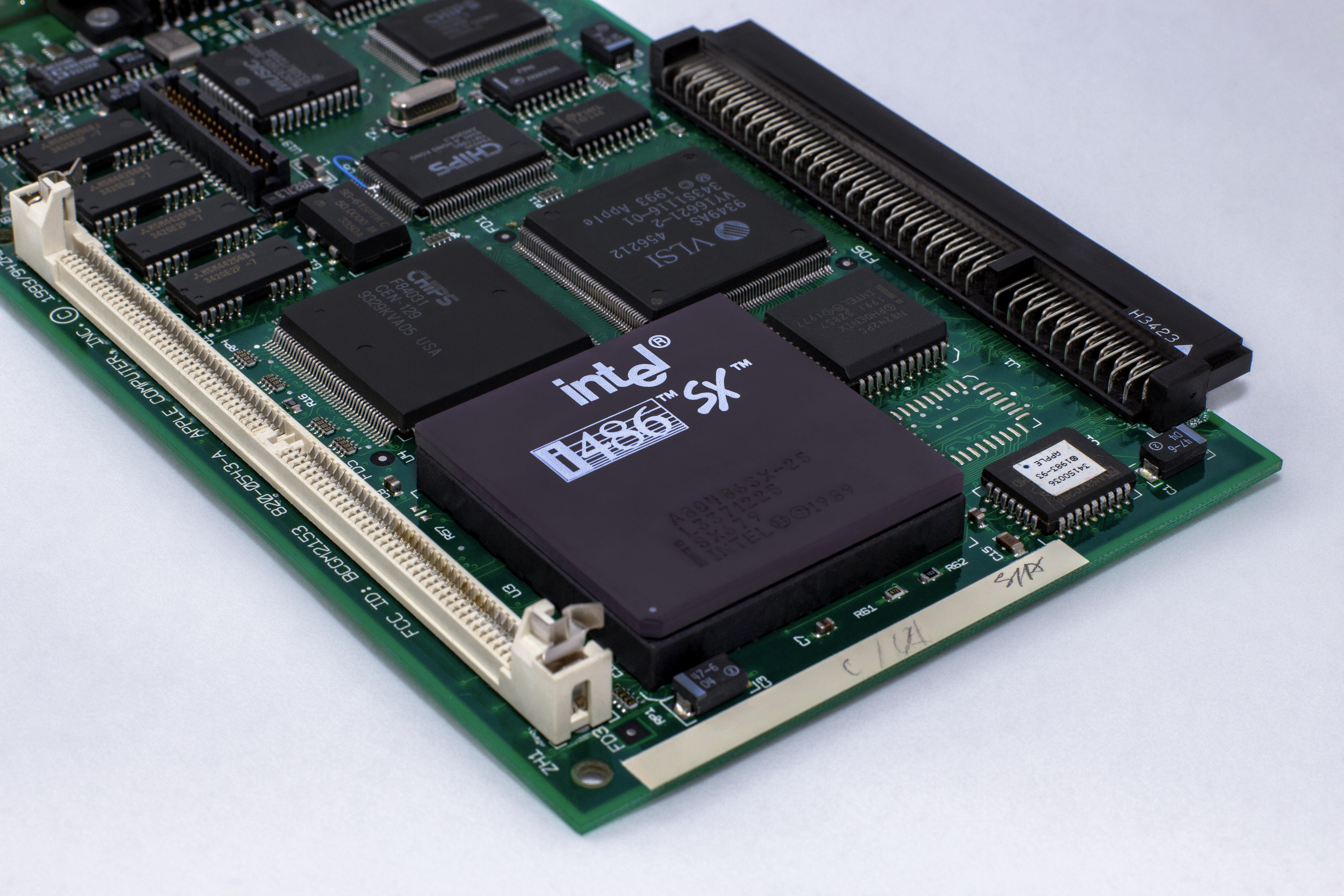
Apple's first DOS Compatibility Card for the Centris/Quadra 610 with an Intel i486SX processor

- Apple IIe Card for the Macintosh LC family
- DOS Compatibility Card
  - with a 25 MHz Intel i486SX processor for the Macintosh Quadra 610/Centris 610
  - with a 66 MHz Intel i486DX2 processor for the Power Macintosh 6100
- PC Compatibility Card
  - 7-inch PCI card with a 100 MHz Cyrix 5x86 processor for the Power Macintosh 5400, 6400, 7200, 7500, 7600, 8500, and 9500
  - 12-inch PCI card with a 100 MHz Intel Pentium processor for the Power Macintosh 5400, 7200, 7500, 7600, 8500, and 9500
  - 12-inch PCI card with a 166 MHz Intel Pentium processor for the Power Macintosh 4400, 7220, 7200, 7300, 7500, 7600, 8500, 8600, 9500, and 9600
  - 12-inch PCI card with a 133 MHz Cyrix 6x86 processor for the Power Macintosh 4400 and 7220

==== By other manufacturers ====
- AST Research released the Mac86, a PDS expansion card for the Macintosh SE that provided DOS compatibility using a 10 MHz Intel 8086. It was followed by the Mac286, which used an 80286 processor and connected to the Macintosh II through its NuBus expansion slots. After AST exited the Macintosh market, it sold the rights to both products to Orange Micro.
- Dayna Communications released the MacCharlie, which provided DOS compatibility for the Macintosh 128K and Macintosh 512K.
- Orange Micro developed the OrangePC series of cards as successors to the Mac86 and Mac286. The cards used 80386, 80486, and Pentium processors, with later models featuring processors up to a 400 MHz AMD K6-2. Orange Micro also released the PCfx!, a simplified OrangePC card with a soldered 200 MHz Pentium processor.
- Reply Corporation's DOS on Mac series of cards provided DOS compatibility through a PDS expansion card equipped with an 80486 or 5x86 processor running at up to 100 MHz. They supported the Centris, Quadra, Performa, and Power Macintosh families. Later models supported PCI-based Power Macintosh computers and Pentium processors running at up to 200 MHz. Radius acquired the technology in 1997 and marketed the cards under the Detente name.

=== IBM PC compatibles ===
- 3DO Blaster, an ISA expansion card that enabled IBM PC compatible computers running Microsoft Windows to play 3DO games.
- Amstrad Mega PC, an IBM PC compatible computer that combined PC hardware with Sega Mega Drive compatibility.
- PC-FXGA, an ISA expansion card that provided PC-FX compatibility for DOS/V-based IBM PC compatibles.

=== Amiga ===
- Amiga Sidecar for the Amiga 1000

=== Archimedes ===
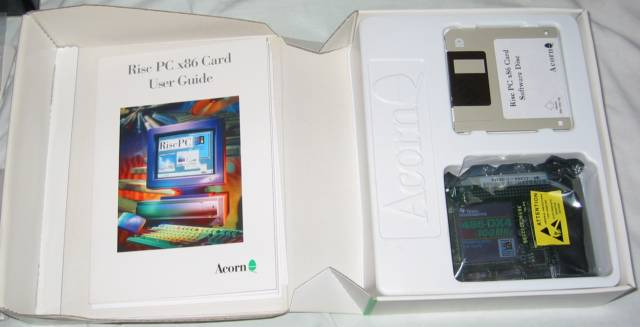
An open box for the Risc PC x86 card

- In 1992, the company Aleph One released the 386PC, an expansion that added a 20 MHz 386SX processor to the Archimedes for running DOS applications. Licensed versions of these cards were soon made by Acorn for the A3020 and A4000; these official cards were available with both 386SX and 486SLC processors.
- An updated DOS compatibility card with a 40 MHz 486SX (underclocked to 33 MHz) was available as an upgrade for the Archimedes' successor, the Risc PC.

=== BBC Micro ===
==== By Acorn ====
- Z80 second processor
- 32016 second processor
- ARM evaluation system

==== By other manufacturers ====
- Other second processors including Intel 8088, Motorola 6809 and 68000-based second processors.

=== GameCube ===
- The Game Boy Player includes a system board on a cartridge providing the GameCube with full Game Boy Advance, Game Boy Color and Game Boy compatibility.

=== Nintendo 64 ===
- The Wide-Boy64 includes a system board on a cartridge providing the Nintendo 64 with full Game Boy Color and Game Boy compatibility.
- The Wide-Boy64 AGB includes a system board on a cartridge providing the Nintendo 64 with full Game Boy Advance, Game Boy Color and Game Boy compatibility.

=== PC-98 ===
- The PC-FXGA is a C-bus expansion card that provides PC-FX compatibility for PC-98 computers.

=== SPARC ===
- The SunPC and SunPCi cards are x86 PC motherboards that can be installed in Sun Microsystems SPARC-based workstations.

=== Super Nintendo Entertainment System ===
- The Super Game Boy and Super Game Boy 2 include a system board on a cartridge providing the Super NES with full Game Boy compatibility with enhancements.
