= Power Macintosh 7300 =

Personal computer by Apple Computer

Power Macintosh 7300 / Workgroup Server 7350
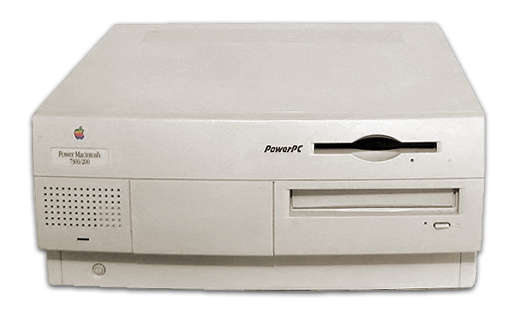
- Power Macintosh 7300/200
- Also known as: "Montana"
- Developer: Apple Computer
- Product family: Power Macintosh, Workgroup Server, Outrigger Macintosh
- Released: February 17, 1997
- Introductory price: US$2,300 (equivalent to $4,613 in 2025)
- Discontinued: October 10, 1997
- Operating system: System 7.5.5 – Mac OS 9.1
- CPU: PowerPC 604e @ 166, 180 or 200 MHz
- Memory: 16 MB, expandable to 1 GB (70 ns, 5V, 168-pin DIMM)
- Dimensions: 6.15 × 14.37 × 16.93 in (15.6 × 36.5 × 43.0 cm)
- Weight: 22 lb (10 kg)
- Predecessor: Power Macintosh 7200; Power Macintosh 7600
- Successor: Power Macintosh G3 (desktop)
- Related: Power Macintosh 4400; Power Macintosh 8600; Power Macintosh 9600

The Power Macintosh 7300 (also sold with server software as the Workgroup Server 7350) is a personal computer designed, manufactured and sold by Apple Computer from February 1997 to November 1997. It was introduced with 166, 180 and 200 MHz CPUs in February 1997 as a mid-range offering alongside the entry-level Power Macintosh 4400, high-end 8600 and the top of the line 9600. The 7300 replaced the Power Macintosh 7600.

MacUser Magazine's review says the 7300 "offers the most satisfying improvement" of the new machines introduced in early 1997 due to a significant performance jump from its predecessors, as well as offering 50% faster CD-ROM and hard disk space.

The 7300 was replaced by the Power Macintosh G3 desktop model in November 1997. The Workgroup Server 7350 continued to be sold until March 1998 when the Macintosh Server G3 was introduced.

== Hardware ==
The 7300 uses the "Outrigger" case first introduced with the Power Macintosh 7500, but features an enhanced PowerPC 604e CPU. However, it no longer came with the video in capability the 7600 had, which possibly accounts for the fact that this is the only time that Apple used a lower model number for an upgraded model. Apart from that, the 7300 is more closely related to the 7600 than to the 7200, with features such as a processor daughtercard and interleaved RAM.

A "PC Compatible" version of the 180 MHz model was offered with a pre-installed PC Compatibility Card in a PCI card slot with a 166 MHz Pentium processor, allowing it to run MS-DOS and Windows 95, which came preinstalled.

Like the Power Macintosh 7600, the 7300 series utilizes 168-pin DRAM DIMMS and allows for eight modules to be added for 1 GB in total. It utilized VRAM SIMMS and allowed four modules to be added for a total of 4 MB, providing output at a resolution of up to 1152 × 870 at 24-bit and 1280 × 1024 at 16-bit. Additionally, it includes three PCI slots allowing the addition of third party cards, including graphics cards.

A 2 GB SCSI hard drive was included as standard, on an internal 10 MB/s SCSI bus, with an external 5 MB/s SCSI port on the back panel.

== Models ==
Introduced February 13, 1997:

- Power Macintosh 7300/166: Sold in Europe and Asia.

Introduced February 17, 1997:

- Power Macintosh 7300/180
- Power Macintosh 7300/200

Introduced April 4, 1997:

- Power Macintosh 7300/180 PC Compatible – bundled with a PC Compatibility Card

Introduced April 21, 1997:

- Workgroup Server 7350/180

== Timeline ==
Timeline of Power Macintosh models
See also: List of Mac models
