= Macintosh Quadra 800 =

Personal computer by Apple, Inc.

Macintosh Quadra 800 / Workgroup Server 80
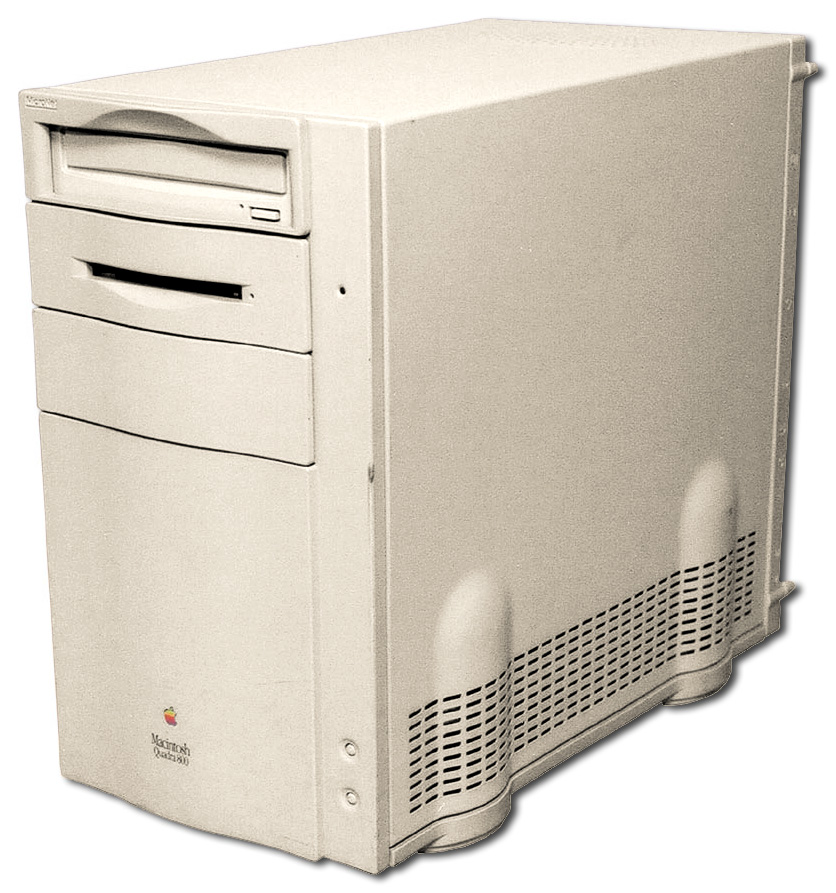
- A Macintosh Quadra 800
- Also known as: "Fridge", "Wombat 33"
- Developer: Apple Computer, Inc.
- Product family: Macintosh Quadra, Workgroup Server
- Released: February 10, 1993
- Introductory price: US$4,679 (equivalent to $10,428 in 2025)
- Discontinued: March 14, 1994
- Operating system: System 7.1 – Mac OS 8.1; A/UX 3.0.1 – 3.1.1
- CPU: Motorola 68040 @ 33 MHz
- Memory: 8 MB, expandable to 136 MB (60 ns 72-pin SIMM)
- Dimensions: Height: 14 inches (36 cm); Width: 7.7 inches (20 cm); Depth: 15.75 inches (40.0 cm)
- Weight: 24 pounds (11 kg)
- Predecessor: Macintosh Quadra 700
- Successor: Macintosh Quadra 840AV; Power Macintosh 8100

The Macintosh Quadra 800 (also sold with bundled server software as the Apple Workgroup Server 80) is a personal computer that is a part of Apple Computer's Quadra series of Macintosh computers.

Introduced in February 1993 alongside the first Macintosh Centris models, the Quadra 800 was the first totally new model in the Quadra lineup since the previous members, the 700 and the 900 / 950, had been introduced two years prior. It was positioned below the flagship Quadra 950 and succeeded the Quadra 700 (which was discontinued shortly after the Quadra 800's announcement). Debuting at half the price of the Quadra 950, the Quadra 800 featured the same Motorola 68040 33 MHz processor as the 950 but its additional interleaved RAM running at 70 ns, as well as an enhanced video system and SCSI bus, enabled it to outperform the Quadra 950. Comparisons also showed the Quadra 800 outperforming the newer Quadra 650 and Quadra 630, both also powered by the 68040 clocked at 33 MHz.

The Quadra 800 was joined later that year by the multimedia-focused Quadra 840AV, which also shared the same form factor. The housing, chassis, power supply, and internal storage assemblies are the same, but the 840AV had the power button on the front. The 840AV has a faster 40 MHz Motorola 68040, a DAV slot (in line with NuBus slot A) and the new GeoPort, but lacks the 800's Processor Direct Slot and second ADB port. Also, unlike the 800's 8 MB of fixed RAM, all of the 840AV's memory is in SIMMs (this is the reason why the 800 has a higher maximum amount of memory).

The Quadra 800 was discontinued in March 1994 in favor of the PowerPC-based Power Macintosh 8100. Both the 8100 and its successor, the Power Macintosh 8500, used the Quadra 800 case, as did the Power Macintosh 8200, a model only available in Europe which used the Power Macintosh 7200 logic board. A taller, highly modified variant of the case was also used for the Power Macintosh 9500.

== Hardware ==
Case: Apple introduced a new mini-tower case design for the Quadra 800, which was subsequently used for the Quadra 840AV, Power Macintosh 8100, 8200 and 8500, while a taller variant was used for the 9500. The Quadra 800's mid-tower case had four drive bays, giving it more expansion options than the Quadra 700's mini-tower, while having a form factor still considerably shorter than the Quadra 900/950's full tower. However the Quadra 800 required removal of the motherboard for RAM or VRAM upgrades, so some dubbed it one of Apple's worst cases of all time. Infoworld described the case's flaw as follows: "Apple recommends that you take your machine into an authorized dealer to install additional memory. It’s no wonder — the procedure is fraught with difficulties (although not as bad as previous compact models such as the SE). In order to access the SIMM slots, you need to detach the logic board from its plastic holders (which are easily broken). You then flip the board over to access the slots. If you have any boards in the machine, you need to remove them. And when you try to put it all back together, you may find some of your internal SCSI connections have come loose."

Video: The logic board has 512 KB of on-board VRAM; this is sufficient to provide 256-color (8-bit) support on monitors up to 16 inches in size. Two VRAM SIMM slots provide the ability to upgrade to 1 MB of VRAM, which allows for 32,768 color (16-bit) resolutions. Unlike the preceding Quadra 700 and Quadra 900/950 and upcoming Quadra 840AV which could be upgraded to 2 MB of VRAM so that on-board video can operate at 24-bit color, 24-bit color support was removed from the Quadra 800 as a cost-saving measure. David Pogue described this as "Apple deliberately crippling this machine to enhance the attractiveness of the Quadra 900 and 950 models." However, installing a 24-bit video card enables the user to use the Quadra 800 in 24-bit mode, and these accelerated video cards for supporting large screens are faster than the 950's on-board video.

CD-ROM: Some configurations included an AppleCD 300i 2x CD-ROM. The Quadra 800 was one of the first Macintoshes shipped with a bootable CD-ROM.

== Models ==
All configurations include an external SCSI port, two ADB and two serial ports, 3 NuBus slots, a Processor Direct Slot, mono audio in, and stereo audio out. The inclusion of an AAUI Ethernet port varied by region. The newly-introduced Apple Desktop Bus Mouse II was included with all configurations.

Introduced February 10, 1993:

- Macintosh Quadra 800: Sold in multiple configurations.
  - 8 MB RAM (onboard), 512 KB VRAM (onboard), no HDD
  - 8 MB RAM (onboard), 512 KB VRAM (onboard), 230 MB HDD. US$4,679.
  - 8 MB RAM (onboard), 512 KB VRAM (onboard), 500 MB HDD
  - 24 MB RAM (8 MB onboard + 16 MB SIMM), 1 MB VRAM (512 KB onboard + 512 KB SIMM), 1 GB HDD

Introduced March 22, 1993:

- Workgroup Server 80

== Timelines ==
Timeline of Macintosh Centris, LC, Performa, and Quadra models, colored by CPU type

See also: List of Mac models

Timeline of Macintosh servers
See also: List of Mac models
