= Apple Workgroup Server =

Family of workgroup servers by Apple

Apple Workgroup Server and Macintosh Server are a family of Macintosh-based workgroup servers, sold by Apple Computer from 1993 to 2003. Machines bearing these names are re-branded Centris, Quadra and Power Macintosh systems with additional server software and sometimes larger hard drives. Apart from that, they were mostly identical to the machines they are based on. The "Workgroup Server" name was used until the release of the Power Macintosh G3 in 1998.

In 1996 and 1997, Apple also sold a separate range of machines marketed as the Apple Network Server, which were specially designed servers that exclusively ran AIX and thus do not qualify as Macintosh computers.

The first models were the Workgroup Server 60, 80 and 95, introduced together at CeBIT in Hanover on March 22, 1993. Customer shipments of the 95 began in April, with the 60 and 80 following in July. New models were introduced every year except 1995, and remained on the market until 2003, several months after the rack-mounted Xserve was introduced.

== List of models ==
Name	Introduced	Discontinued	Based on	Notes
Workgroup Server 95	March 1993	April 1995	Macintosh Quadra 950	Was sold with A/UX, but is able to run Mac OS as well. The differences to the Quadra are a digital tape drive (DAT) and a PDS card containing a fast SCSI connection and a 256k level 2 CPU cache. Mac OS Supported: System 7.0.1 to Mac OS 8.1
Workgroup Server 60	July 1993	October 1994	Macintosh Centris 610	The Centris 610 was later sold as the "Quadra 610". Mac OS Supported: (68k, System 7.1-Mac OS 8.1) (PPC, System 7.1.2-Mac OS 9.1)
Workgroup Server 80	July 1993	October 1994	Macintosh Quadra 800	
Workgroup Server 6150	April 1994	October 1995	Power Macintosh 6100	Speed bumped from 60 to 66 MHz in April 1995. Mac OS Supported: (60 MHz, System 7.1.2-Mac OS 9.1) (66 MHz, System 7.5-Mac OS 9.1)
Workgroup Server 8150	April 1994	February 1996	Power Macintosh 8100	Speed bumped from 80 to 110 MHz in April 1995
Workgroup Server 9150	April 1994	February 1996	n/a	The only Workgroup Server not directly based on a workstation. It featured an 80 MHz (speed bumped to 120 MHz in April 1995) PowerPC 601 board in a Quadra 950 style case.
Workgroup Server 7250	February 1996	April 1997	Power Macintosh 7200	
Workgroup Server 8550	February 1996	March 1998	Power Macintosh 8500	
Workgroup Server 7350	April 1997	March 1998	Power Macintosh 7300	
Workgroup Server 9650	April 1997	March 1998	Power Macintosh 9600	
Macintosh Server G3	March 1998	December 1998	Power Macintosh G3 Mini Tower	
Macintosh Server G3	January 1999	August 1999	Power Macintosh G3 Blue and White	
Macintosh Server G4	September 1999	January 2003	Power Mac G4	Multiple models mirroring the Power Mac G4's history. The first is based on the "Sawtooth" (AGP graphics) Power Mac G4, the last on the initial "Mirrored Drive Doors" PowerMac G4.

== Timeline ==
Timeline of Macintosh servers
See also: List of Mac models
