= DOS Compatibility Card =

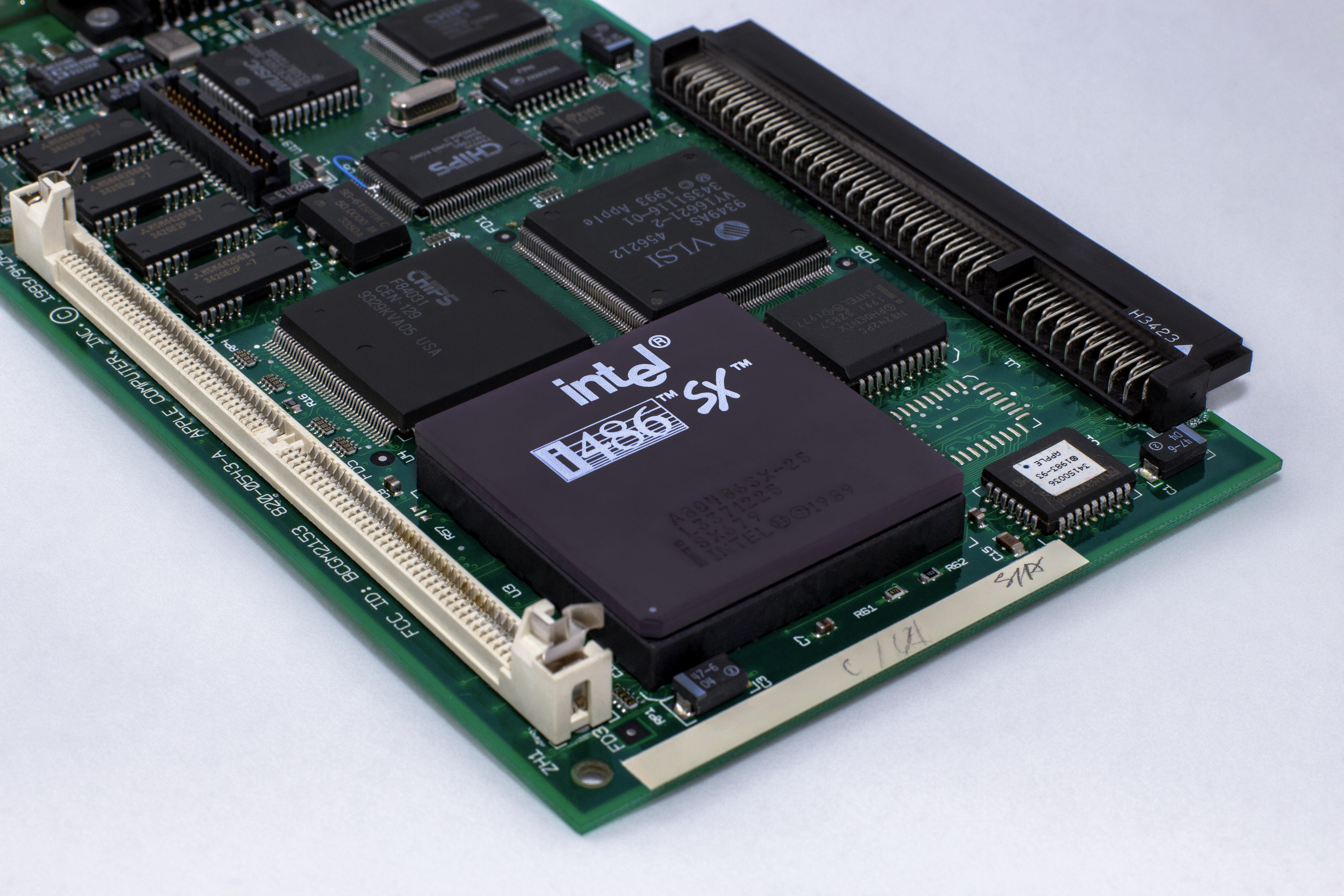
Apple's first DOS Compatibility Card for the Centris/Quadra 610 with an Intel i486SX processor

The DOS Compatibility Card, later renamed the PC Compatibility Card, is a series of compatibility cards developed by Apple Computer that allowed compatible Macintosh computers to run DOS and other PC software.

The card used the Macintosh's video, drives, keyboard, and mouse. A control panel allowed users to switch between the PC and Macintosh environments or display both simultaneously using two monitors.

== First generation ==
Apple introduced the first-generation DOS Compatibility Card in spring 1994 for the Quadra 610 and Centris 610. The card plugged into the Processor Direct Slot (PDS) and contained a 25 MHz Intel i486SX processor, a BIOS from Chips and Technologies, and a VGA chipset. It shipped with MS-DOS 6.2 and supported up to 32 MB of dedicated RAM or could use memory from the Macintosh logic board.

The card, codenamed "Houdini", operated independently of the Macintosh processor, allowing DOS and Windows applications to run concurrently with Mac OS. Users could switch between the two environments using a keyboard shortcut or display them on separate monitors. Apple also integrated several functions between the operating systems: DOS could access the Macintosh floppy drive and built-in CD-ROM drive, share Macintosh printer settings, and exchange files with Mac applications. DOS files were stored in a container file that could be mounted as a Macintosh volume, allowing users to browse its contents through the Macintosh desktop. The system also supported file-extension associations and copying and pasting between DOS and Macintosh applications.

In its review, Macworld gave the card two out of five stars. The magazine criticized its lack of a copy of Windows 3.1, networking support, and PC audio, but noted its relatively low price of US$399 (equivalent to $870 in 2025) and performance that exceeded that of many contemporary PCs. The review also compared it with third-party products, including the OrangePC card from Orange Micro, which cost more but offered additional features.

Apple also bundled the card with a Quadra 610 configuration featuring a 68LC040 processor, 8 MB of RAM, and a 160 MB hard drive. Macworld recommended purchasing a standard Quadra 610 and the compatibility card separately, noting that the bundled configuration's limited memory and storage made it less suitable for running both operating systems.

The card was available for less than three months before stocks ran out because Apple's supplier exhausted its supply of the necessary components. In November 1994, Apple licensed the card's technology to Reply Corporation, which resumed production and offered improved versions for 68040-based Macs.

== Second generation ==
Apple introduced the second-generation DOS Compatibility Card in November 1994 for the Power Macintosh 6100. Designed to plug into the Power Macintosh's PDS, it featured a 66 MHz Intel i486DX2 processor, 16-bit audio compatible with the Sound Blaster 16 on a daughtercard, and support for SVGA graphics at resolutions up to 800 × 600. It shipped with MS-DOS 6.22 and Windows 3.11. The card shipped with no memory soldered to the card, but could support up to 32 MB of dedicated memory. If no memory was installed, it could use memory allocated from the Macintosh logic board. Additionally, the card had 512 KB of video RAM soldered to the card that could not be increased.

Unlike the first-generation card, the second-generation model supported networking and audio. It used the Macintosh's built-in Ethernet and other peripheral interfaces, with the Macintosh handling serial and disk input/output. Networking support included Novell NetWare IPX and TCP protocols through Open Data-Link Interface drivers supplied by Apple. The card could also access DOS-formatted floppy disks, SCSI hard drives, and CD-ROM drives connected to the Macintosh. Users could switch between the two operating systems with a keyboard shortcut or display them simultaneously on separate monitors. The card also supported shared file storage through Macintosh folders mapped as DOS drives and copying and pasting certain text and graphics between the two environments.

The card was available separately for US$739 (equivalent to $1,610 in 2025) or bundled with a US$2,759 (equivalent to $5,990 in 2025) Power Macintosh 6100 configuration featuring a PowerPC 601 processor at 66 MHz, 16 MB of RAM, and a 500 MB hard drive.

== Third generation ==
Apple introduced the third-generation card in late 1996 under the PC Compatibility Card name. Unlike the prior generations which used the PDS, these cards were available in two PCI configurations: a 7-inch card with a 100 MHz Cyrix 5x86 processor for US$799 (equivalent to $1,640 in 2025) and a 12-inch card with a 100 MHz Pentium processor for US$1,049 (equivalent to $2,150 in 2025). The 7-inch card was compatible with the Power Macintosh 5400, 6400, 7200, 7500, 7600, 8500, and 9500. The 12-inch card supported the 5400, 7200, 7500, 7600, 8500, and 9500, but not the 6400. Both cards included 8 MB of RAM and 1 MB of video RAM, and supported Sound Blaster-compatible audio.

The cards shipped with MS-DOS 6.22, and supported Windows 3.11 and Windows 95, which were sold separately. The cards also included a print spooler for Windows printer drivers and a clipboard that allowed copying and pasting between DOS and the Mac OS. The 12-inch card had a 64-bit memory path and 256 KB of Level 2 cache, while the 7-inch card had a 32-bit memory path and 128 KB of cache. The 12-inch card's memory was soldered to the board and could be expanded to 72 MB through a DIMM slot. The 7-inch card had a single DIMM slot occupied by its 8 MB of included memory, which could be replaced with a larger module for expansion up to 64 MB. The 12-inch card could also be upgraded with an additional 1 MB of video RAM for higher-resolution displays with millions of colors.

Both cards included video circuitry based on the ATI Mach64 and shared system resources, including the Macintosh's CD-ROM drive and audio and video inputs. MacUser noted that installation required connecting the card to these components and that the cards did not support input from the Macintosh's microphone. The review also noted that using a two-button mouse's left button required a keyboard shortcut because the Macintosh did not support two-button mice.

The 12-inch card was also available preinstalled in the Power Macintosh 7200 as the Power Macintosh 7200/120 PC Compatible. MacUser reported that purchasing the bundled system cost about US$150 (equivalent to $310 in 2025) less than buying the computer and card separately. The magazine found that the Pentium-based card performed comparably to a midrange 100 MHz Pentium PC in some benchmark tests, while the Cyrix-based card was slower. It also noted that the cards were more expensive than software-based PC emulation, and that the Cyrix version was best suited to Macintosh systems that could not accommodate a full-size card.

Apple offered a PCI card that worked in parallel with the PC Compatibility Card to add a serial and parallel port.

== Fourth generation ==
Apple introduced a fourth-generation PC Compatibility Cards in two 12-inch PCI configurations in April 1997. The "12-inch 166-P" card featured a 166 MHz Intel Pentium processor and was compatible with the Power Macintosh 4400/7220, 7200, 7300, 7500, 7600, 8500, 8600, 9500, and 9600 series. The 166-P card was also available preinstalled in the Power Macintosh 7300 as the Power Macintosh 7300/180 PC Compatible.

The other configuration, the "12-inch 166-C" card was compatible only with the Power Macintosh 4400 and its regional counterpart, the 7220. It was a lower-cost option intended for these entry-level models. It used a 133 MHz 6x86 processor which Cyrix marketed as "Performance Rated 166," claiming performance comparable to that of a 166 MHz Intel Pentium. The card was bundled with the Power Macintosh 4400/200 PC Compatible, known as the 7220/200 PC Compatible in Asia and Australia.

Both cards included 16 MB of RAM soldered to the card, expandable to 80 MB with a 64 MB, 168-pin, 60 ns DRAM DIMM, and 256 KB of Level 2 cache. The 166-P card included 2 MB of non-expandable video DRAM, while the 166-C card had 1 MB, but was expandable to 2 MB.

The card also worked in parallel with Apple's PCI card with adding a serial and parallel port first offered with the third generation card.
