= 3DO Blaster =

3DO PC card hardware

The 3DO Blaster is an expansion card produced by Creative Labs from 1994 designed to allow compatible Windows-based PCs to play 3DO format games. It is a full-sized ISA compatibility card with the 3DO logic board included, with the input (controllers) and output (video & audio) redirected to the PC. Its name was derived from the company's other Blaster products for PC such as the Sound Blaster. The 3DO Blaster provided a simple plug and play alternative using the established 3DO standard, instead of building a custom graphics unit that may run into incompatibilities. Having partnered with The 3DO Company, Creative attempted to make the 3DO Blaster "the standard for PC games".

The product was marketed as a single board for CD-ROM drive owners (but only drives with a Panasonic interface) or bundled with the necessary CD-ROM drive. The software drivers allowed for Windows 3.1 based gameplay, which featured real-time stretching of the game window and screenshot capturing. As graphics boards of the time were not up to par with the system's needs, a pass-through using a VGA feature connector link was used, thus reserving an area on screen to be used by the 3DO Blaster card's output. Thus, there was no impact on the CPU. As with the first 3DO system from Panasonic (REAL FZ-1) an FMV daughter-card enabling Video CD playback was planned by Creative, but since the 3DO Blaster failed to achieve momentum, it was never released. Saved games were stored in NVRAM on the card.

The card was first released near the end of 1994 with a U.S. retail price of $399.95; this was the same price as a 3DO Interactive Multiplayer console at the time.

== Bundle contents ==
The card was sold with the cables needed, a 3DO controller by Logitech, and two 3DO games on CD: Shock Wave from Electronic Arts and Gridders from Tetragon. Despite showing the 'long boxes' of the two games on the back of the packing box, they were included in jewel cases only. A third CD, containing demos of popular 3DO games was also included. Not included was software from Aldus; Aldus Photostyler SE and Aldus Gallery Effects Vol. 1, but pictures of both titles can be seen on the back of the 3DO Blaster packing box.

== Hardware requirements ==
- Intel or compatible PC with 80386 CPU and Microsoft Windows
- Any of these Sound Blaster cards: Sound Blaster Pro, Sound Blaster 16 or Sound Blaster AWE32
- A CD-ROM drive with a Panasonic interface
- A free ISA slot
- A VGA graphics card with VGA feature connector
- 4 megabytes of RAM

== See also ==
- 3DO
- Creative Labs
