= Macintosh Quadra 950 =

Personal computer by Apple Computer

Macintosh Quadra 950 / Workgroup Server 95
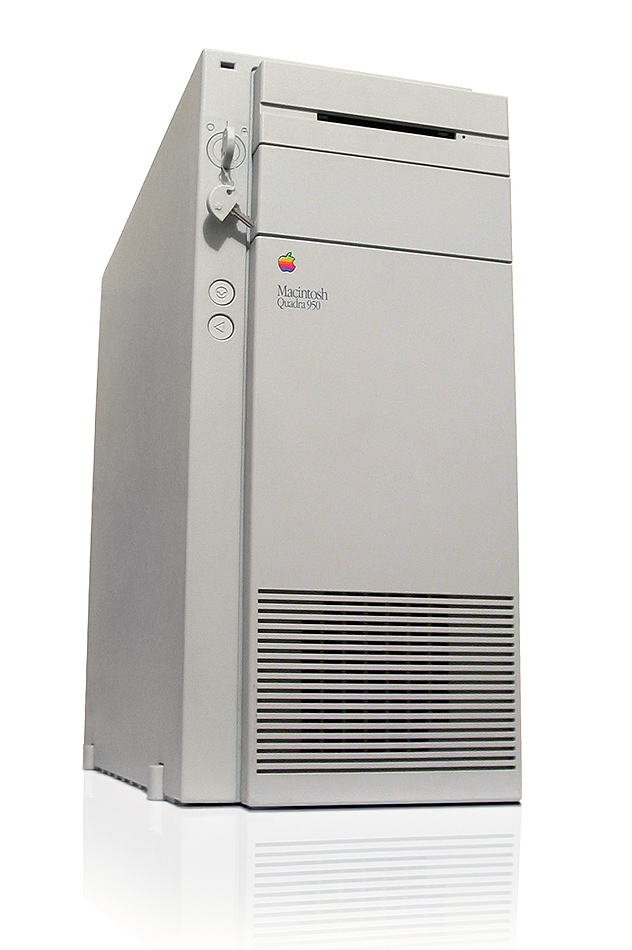
- A Macintosh Quadra 950
- Also known as: "Amazon"
- Developer: Apple Computer
- Product family: Macintosh Quadra, Workgroup Server
- Released: March 18, 1992
- Introductory price: US$7,200 (equivalent to $16,520 in 2025)
- Discontinued: October 14, 1995
- Operating system: System 7.0.1 – Mac OS 8.1; A/UX 3.0 – 3.1.1
- CPU: Motorola 68040 @ 33 MHz
- Memory: 4 MB, expandable to 256 MB (80 ns 30-pin SIMM)
- Dimensions: Height: 18.6 in (47.25 cm); Width: 8.9 in (22.6 cm); Depth: 20.6 in (52.32 cm)
- Weight: 36.8 pounds (16.7 kg)
- Predecessor: Macintosh Quadra 900
- Successor: Power Macintosh 9500; Workgroup Server 9150

The Macintosh Quadra 950 (also sold with additional software and hardware as the Workgroup Server 95) is a personal computer designed, manufactured and sold by Apple Computer from March 1992 to October 1995. It replaced the Quadra 900 that was introduced several months earlier, increasing the CPU clock rate of its 68040 CPU from 25 MHz to 33 MHz, and improving the graphics support. The two computers were otherwise identical, including the price. With a Macintosh Processor Upgrade Card installed, this computer is known as the Power Macintosh 950.

In 1993, the 950 was overtaken in performance by the less expensive Quadra 800 and 840AV. The newer Quadras were faster due to the addition of interleaved RAM, as well as an enhanced video system and SCSI bus, while the 840AV had an even faster 40 MHz 68040. However, their more compact (mini-tower) case offered less expansion capability, so the 950 (due to its mid-tower case allowing 6 slots to be supported) was kept in continued production for the server market. The 950 ending up outliving the 800 and 840AV, the latter two which were replaced after one year of production by PowerPC-based Power Macintosh models using the same mini-tower case.

The Quadra 950 was succeeded by the PowerPC-based Power Macintosh 9500 in June 1995, with the 9500 using a taller version of the Quadra 800 case. The Workgroup Server 95 was succeeded by the PowerPC-based Workgroup Server 9150, which retains the same Quadra 900/950 case. Quadra 950 sales continued until October 1995, being the last Macintosh Quadra sold by Apple, and one of the last 68k models to be discontinued, due to its high RAM capacity and large number of NuBus slots.

== Hardware ==
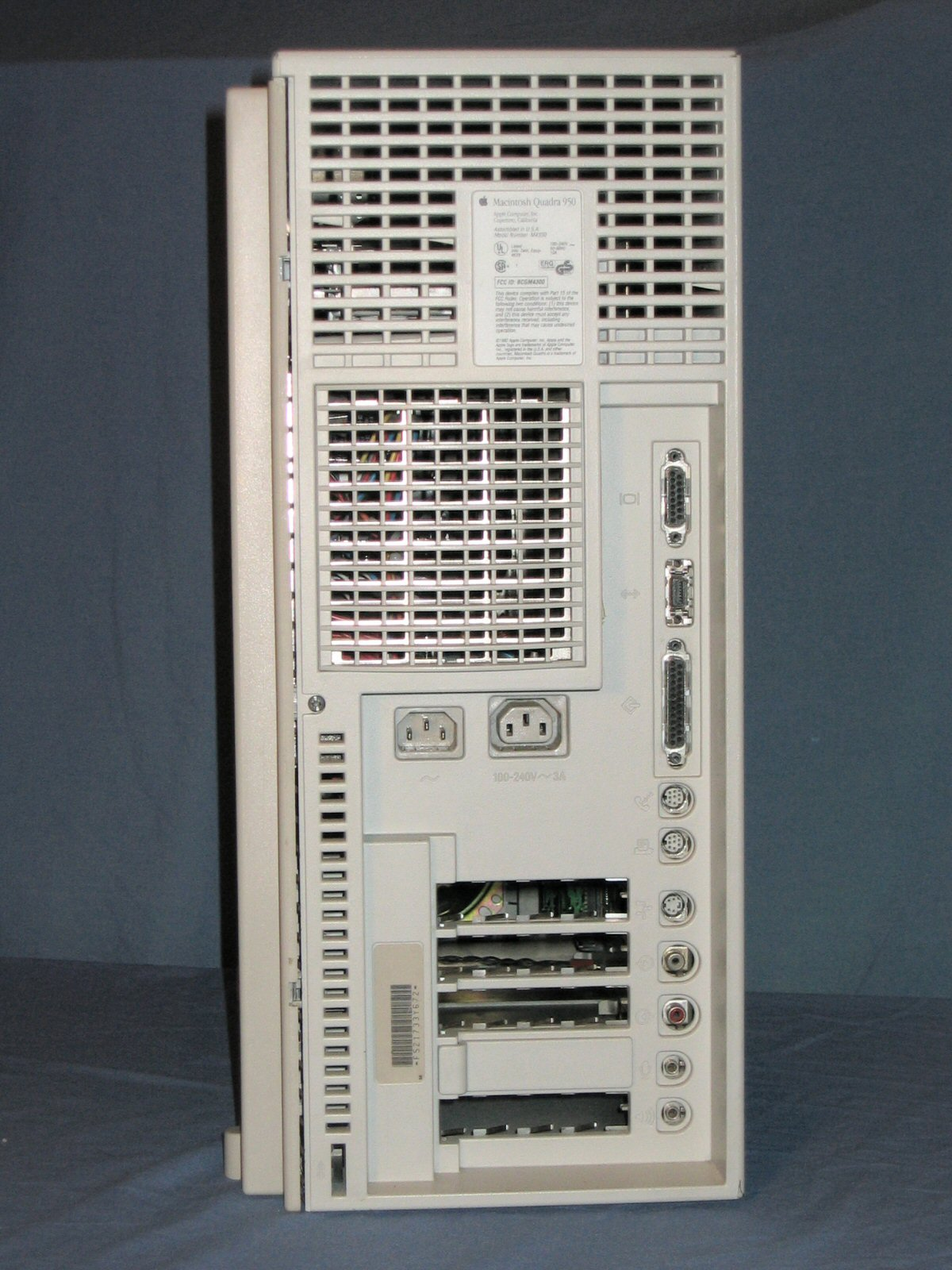
Rear view of a Quadra 950

The logic board has five NuBus slots and a Processor Direct Slot, but due to the positioning of the PDS it is not possible to use one of the NuBus slots when a PDS card is installed. The NuBus-90 standard is partially supported, allowing for cards to run at 20 MHz, and two of the slots provide 25 watts of power instead of the usual 15 watts.

The logic board has 1 MB of on-board video RAM, with 4 SIMM slots that allow for upgrading to 2 MB VRAM so it can operate at 24-bit color. This feature was also shared with the preceding Quadra 700 and 900 and upcoming Quadra 840AV. 24-bit color support was removed from newer Quadra and Centris models as a cost-saving measure although 24-bit color could be enabled in these models with a video card.

The 950 includes a key to limit access to various subsystems depending on the computer's use environment. The key switch has three positions labelled OFF, ON and SECURE. The OFF position immediately cuts the power and prevents the computer from being powered on. The ON position allows the computer to operate normally. The SECURE position is intended for use as a server – power is always applied in this position. If the computer loses power, it immediately starts up when power is restored. Also, this position disables the keyboard, mouse and floppy disk drive.

The Workgroup Server 95 models include the Workgroup Server PDS Card which provides two SCSI controllers with two internal SCSI connectors (plus one external connector), a direct memory access controller for SCSI transfers to reduce I/O load on the main CPU, and 128 KB of SRAM used as an L2 cache and expandable using three additional slots to a total of 512 KB. Described as "a Quadra 950 with some minor, but important, modifications", these modifications enabled file transfers at speeds ranging from twice as fast to nine times as fast as the earlier system. Particularly important was A/UX's "excellent use of a disk cache", in contrast to the "horrendous speed penalties" of disk caching under System 7.

== Models ==
The Quadra 950 was announced on March 18, with dealers receiving machines around May 18.

Introduced May 18, 1992:

- Macintosh Quadra 950: 33 MHz 68040 CPU. $7,200 for a floppy drive only model, $8,499 with a 230 MB HDD, and $9,199 with a 400 MB HDD. 8 MB of memory was standard everywhere except for some European countries, where the standard included memory was 4 MB.

Introduced March 22, 1993:

- Workgroup Server 95: Sold in several configurations, all of which include a 33 MHz 68040 CPU and a PDS card containing a Fast SCSI connection. In the United States, the configurations were split into "File and Print" and "Database" configurations:
  - File/Print: 16 MB RAM, 230 MB HDD, 128 KB L2 cache. US$7,589 (equivalent to $16,914 in 2025).
  - File/Print: 16 MB RAM, 500 MB HDD, DDS tape drive, 256 KB L2 cache. US$10,039 (equivalent to $22,374 in 2025).
  - File/Print: 32 MB RAM, 1 GB HDD, DDS tape drive, AppleShare Pro, 512 KB L2 cache. US$12,839 (equivalent to $28,615 in 2025).
  - Database: 32 MB RAM, 230 MB and 500 MB HDDs, DDS tape drive, 256 KB L2 cache. US$11,319 (equivalent to $25,227 in 2025).
  - Database: 48 MB RAM, 230 MB and 1 GB HDDs, DDS tape drive, 512 KB L2 cache. US$12,929 (equivalent to $28,815 in 2025).

== Specifications ==
- Processor: 33 MHz Motorola 68040
- Processor Cache: 8 KB Level 1
- Bus Speed: 33 MHz
- Hard Drive: 230 MB – 1 GB
- Media drives: 1.44 MB floppy drive, optional DDS-DC drive (Workgroup Server 95)
- Software: Mac OS 7.1 – 8.1
- Logicboard RAM: None
- Maximum RAM: 256 MB
- Type of RAM: 30-pin SIMM (16 slots)
- Minimum RAM Speed: 80 ns
- Interleaving Support: No
- Graphics: Integrated
- Display Connection: DB-15
- Graphics Memory: 1 MB standard, upgradable to 2 MB via 4 VRAM slots
- Expansion Slots: 5 - NuBus, 1 - PDS
- Hard Drive Bus: SCSI
- Backup Battery: 3.6 V Lithium
- Max Watts: 303 W
- Ports: AAUI-15 Ethernet, 1 ADB, DB-25 SCSI, 2 Serial, 3.5-mm mono input jack, 3.5-mm stereo output jack

== Notable uses ==
AnimEigo upgraded their subtitling hardware to this model during the mid-1990s.

American industrial rock band Nine Inch Nails used the Quadra 950 during the recording of their album The Fragile, utilising its NuBus expansion slots for Pro Tools I/O cards.

== Timelines ==
Timeline of Macintosh Centris, LC, Performa, and Quadra models, colored by CPU type

See also: List of Mac models

Timeline of Macintosh servers
See also: List of Mac models
