= Apple Network Server =

Line of PowerPC-based computers

- Developer: Apple Computer
- Type: Server
- Released: February 26, 1996
- Discontinued: April 1, 1997
- CPU: PowerPC 604, 132 – 150 MHz; PowerPC 604e, 200 MHz
- Successor: Xserve

The Apple Network Server (ANS) was a line of PowerPC-based server computers designed, manufactured and sold by Apple Computer, Inc. from February 1996 to April 1997. It was codenamed "Shiner" and originally consisted of two models, the Network Server 500/132 ("Shiner LE", i.e., "low-end") and the Network Server 700/150 ("Shiner HE", i.e., "high-end"), which got a companion model, the Network Server 700/200 (also "Shiner HE") with a faster CPU in November 1996.

The machines were not a part of the Apple Macintosh line of computers; they were designed to run IBM's AIX operating system and their ROM specifically prevented booting the classic Mac OS. This makes them the last non-Macintosh desktop computers made by Apple to date. The 500/132, 700/150, and 700/200 sold in the U.S. market for $11,000, $15,000 and $19,000, respectively.

Apple Network Servers are not to be confused with the Apple Workgroup Servers and the Macintosh Servers, which were Macintosh workstations that shipped with server software and used Mac OS; the sole exception, the Workgroup Server 95—a Quadra 950 with an added SCSI controller that shipped with A/UX—was also capable of running Mac OS. Apple did not have comparable server hardware in their product lineup again until the introduction of the Xserve in 2002.

The product's short lifespan is attributed to significant financial troubles at Apple in early 1997. CEO Gil Amelio cancelled both Network Server and OpenDoc in the same meeting as it was determined that they were low priorities.

== Hardware ==
The Apple Network Server's hardware was supposed to be based on a new logic board design specific to the product. During the development of the hardware, Apple abandoned the original mainboard design for unconfirmed reasons. In order to move forward and ship the product, Apple made modifications to the Power Macintosh 9500 logic board and ROM (locking out all Mac OS calls) and ported AIX to the new hardware. Whether related to the hardware change or by coincidence, Apple also abandoned its NetWare on PowerPC development (codename: Wormhole) at this time. The general logic board layout seems to suggest a close relationship with PowerPC-based RS/6000 systems by IBM, which also were designed to run AIX. On the other hand, many logic board components, especially the Open Firmware boot ROM, are similar to the "Tsunami" board used in the Power Macintosh 9500 and some Macintosh clones.

While the circuit board layout of the Apple Network Server (ANS) may resemble RS/6000 systems, logically and physically it is almost identical to a Power Macintosh 9500 (PM9500), although running quite different firmware, and which is specific to its unique mission function.

Starting at the top level bus and working downward in the bus hierarchy, at the top level is the CPU bus with a Hammerhead controller (Apple Part # 343S1190) which is also found on the PM9500. The CPU, as mentioned, is a PowerPC 604 or 604e. The CPU bus-to-PCI bus bridges are Bandit controllers (343S0020). Both the ANS and the PM9500 have two Bandit controllers and two separate PCI busses. All devices at the CPU bus level are identical between the ANS and PM9500. On both systems the CPU Bus Clock is supplied by the removable CPU card. However, on the ANS the clock buffer which splits the System Clock for all the CPU Bus Devices is on the logic board, whereas on the PowerMac 9500 the clock buffer is on the CPU card.

The memory data lane controllers are different on the ANS from the ones on the PM9500, presumably because of added support for parity memory. The ANS memory data lane controllers are 343S1161 instead of 343S1141 as on the PM9500. However, the memory structure is the same with two banks of DIMM slots and support for memory interleaving when corresponding slots in different banks contain identical memory DIMMs. The ANS does have eight memory DIMM slots instead of the PM9500's twelve, but other Hammerhead-based machines such as the PM8500 also carry only eight memory DIMM slots.

On the PCI bus, as mentioned above, the ANS uses the Bandit PCI bridge, just as the PM9500 does. The PCI bus arbiters are also identical (343S0182). The bus arbiters receive the PCI Bus Request signals and issue the Bus Grant Signals to the PCI slots and to the PCI bridge chips (Bandit).

The interrupt manager and logic board IO controller is also the same. Both use Grand Central (343S1125). Grand Central is a device on the PCI bus.

At the PCI bus, ANS parts ways with the PM9500 in a few ways. The ANS has two 53C825A SCSI chips with support for Fast & Wide SCSI operations, which are not present in the PM9500. These each appear as a separate PCI device on the PCI bus. The ANS also adds a Cirrus Logic 54M30 video controller as an additional PCI device.

In all the ANS has three PCI devices which the PM9500 lacks. The ANS's PCI slots are also organized differently. On the PM9500, Grand Central and the first three PCI slots are supported by Bandit 1. The remaining three PCI slots are supported by Bandit 2. On the ANS, Grand Central, the two 53C825A SCSI chips, the 54M30 video controller and the upper two PCI slots are supported by Bandit 1. The remaining four PCI slots are supported by Bandit 2. Some may find it interesting that this (six devices supported by Bandit 1) confirms that the Bandit PCI Bridge and associated arbiter chip can directly (no PCI-PCI bridge required) support at least six PCI devices given proper firmware support.

Going down further in the hierarchy, the Grand Central chip is a sort of I/O bus for miscellaneous logic board devices. Both the ANS and the PM9500 use the CURIO chip (AM79C950, custom part from AMD) to support serial ports, a slow (5 MB/s, 53C94/96 based) SCSI bus and 10 Mbit/s ethernet. The SWIM floppy controller is also common to both machines and connected through the Grand Central chip. The ANS lacks the MESH SCSI chip (53CF94/6 derived Apple SCSI chip) which is present on the PM9600 and supports the internal Fast SCSI bus.

Grand Central provides support for eleven system interrupts. On both the Macintosh and the ANS, each PCI slot contains only one interrupt line (up to four supported in PCI spec.) and each interrupt line is used by only one device. The interrupt map is different in the two machines, and this represents the most likely reason why inserting a PM9500 or PM9600 ROM in an ANS will not allow the machine to boot. The firmware expects certain interrupts to correspond to certain events, but the interrupt signal is physically connected to a different device than the firmware expects.

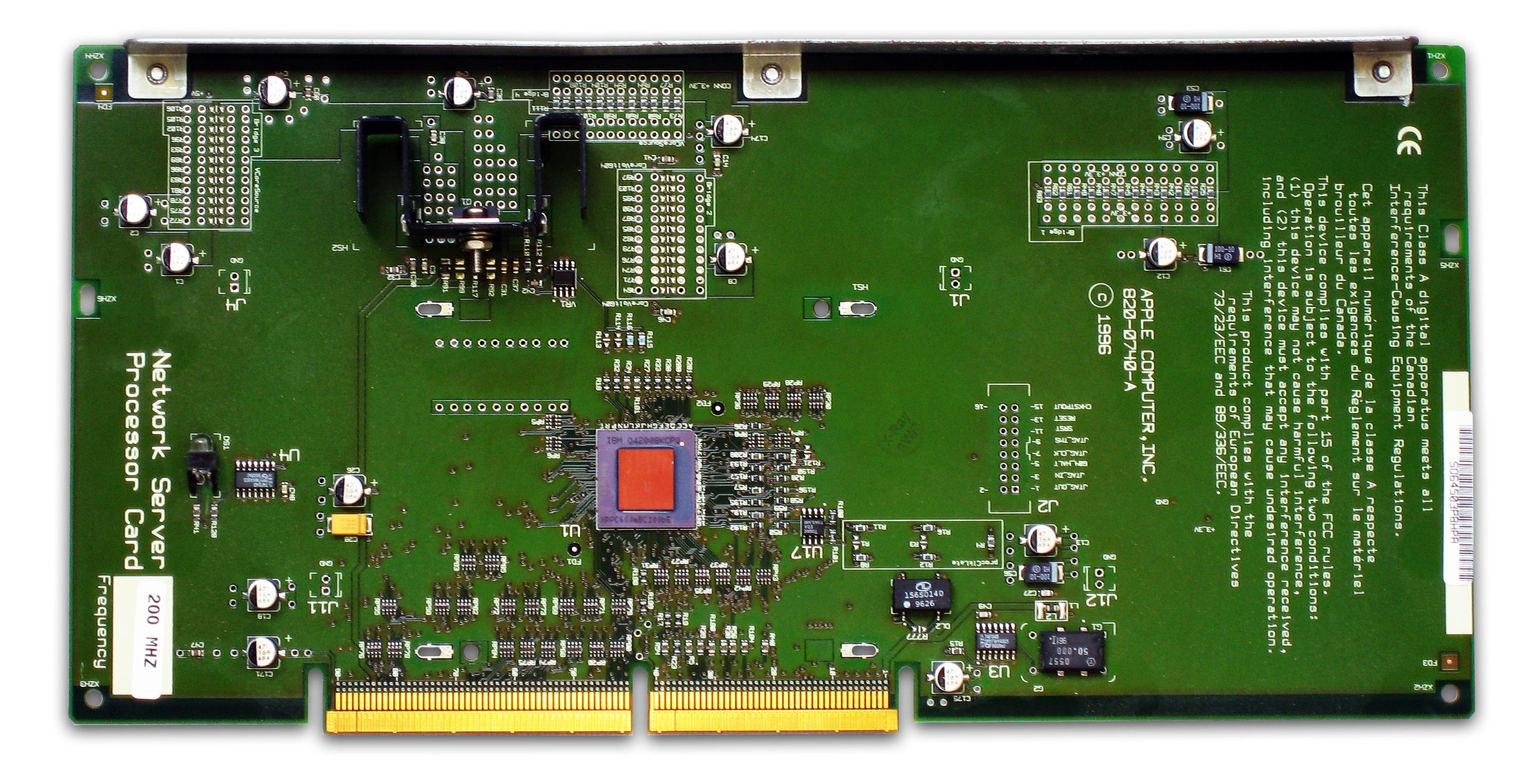
The CPU board of an ANS 700/200. The ANS 500/132 and 700/150 CPUs are made from the same board but each employs unique configuration jumpers. All ANS CPUs have an applied printed label (shown on the extreme left) which identifies the CPU's speed: 132, 150 or 200 MHz. As in this generation of Apple's PowerPC products, the installed processor card determines the system's CPU speed, and the system's bus speed is derived from the CPU's speed: 44 MHz for /132, and 50 MHz for /150 and /200.

The ANS 500/132 uses a PowerPC 604 CPU clocked at 132 MHz, and the ANS 700/150 has the same family CPU but clocked at 150 MHz. Both have a L1 cache of 32 kB. The ANS 700/200 features the more advanced PowerPC 604e clocked at 200 MHz, with an L1 cache of 64 kB. The L2 cache of the ANS is mounted on a SIMM, with a standard size of 512 kB for the 500 and 1 MB for the 700s. Any ANS may have the 1 MB cache card fitted. The system bus speed is 44 MHz for the 500, and 50 MHz for the 700s or any ANS to which the 200 MHz processor card had been fitted. The ANS logic board has eight 168-pin DIMM parity RAM slots with four of them free (with a maximum amount of 512 MB of RAM specified). The ANS 500/132 shipped with 32 MB of RAM installed (4 × 8 MB 60 ns parity DIMMs manufactured by IBM) and the ANS 700/150 and the ANS 700/200 shipped with 48 MB (2 × 16 MB 60 ns + 2 × 8 MB parity DIMMs also manufactured by IBM). For all practical purposes, the maximum RAM configuration is 4 × 128 MB parity DIMMs (512 MB, total) or 8 × 64 MB parity DIMMs (also 512 MB total). The machine will not POST (i.e., will not pass the Power-on System Test) if more than 512 MB is installed. This is an absolute restriction built into the machine's ROM-DIMM. If even one RAM DIMM is non-parity, then parity checking is turned off for all RAM, in which case 70 ns RAM DIMMs are acceptable. FPM or EDO RAM DIMMs are acceptable, in any order, as the machine treats EDO RAM DIMMs as FPM RAM DIMMs.

All Network Servers feature an internal two-channel Wide SCSI-2 controller (narrow, to the CD-ROM drive, and to any hard drives which have been installed with the Apple accessory Narrow SCSI-2 installation kit), an external 25-pin SCSI-1 connector and a standard 1.44 MB "SuperDrive" floppy. Six free PCI slots are available for expansion—parts supported under AIX include two Ethernet cards and a SCSI RAID card. Other ports include one ADB port, two serial ports and one AAUI port. Unlike all other Apple computers of the era, the ANS uses a VGA connector for the on-board video; an adapter for Apple displays was included.

A unique aspect of the Apple Network Servers is their case: It is fully lockable and extremely accessible, it features a small LCD for diagnostics, and its front has seven device slots, with a CD-ROM and one hard drive mounted in them in the standard configuration. Additional hot-swappable SCSI hard drive modules or a DAT tape streamer can be added to the free slots. Optionally, the ANS 700 also supports redundant and hot-swappable power supply units and an internal drive rack for two further fixed hard drives. The case is large and heavy, at a height of 24.5 in (62 cm), a width of 16.5 in (42 cm), a depth of 18 in (46 cm) and a weight of over 80 lb (36 kg), with exact weight depending on hardware configuration. That means that while it is about the right width for a 19-inch rack, it requires at least 14 rack units in height. A third model in a smaller rack-mount case without the large disk array, the Network Server 300 (code named "Deep Dish", as in a deep dish pizza), never got past the prototype stage. Also in development but never released were CPU cards featuring two CPUs. Power Macintosh 9500 CPU cards, which were available with dual processors, were not compatible with the ANS.

An ANS 500/132 may be upgraded to an ANS 500/200 by installing the 200 MHz processor accessory card. It is possible to upgrade an ANS 500 to an ANS 700 or to downgrade an ANS 700 to an ANS 500 simply by exchanging the power back panel and PSU(s), but it is necessary to completely disassemble the base of the ANS in order to accomplish such an upgrade or downgrade. An ANS 700 has but one input power connection, even though it can have dual, independent PSUs. However, an ANS 700 may be easily converted into a dual primary power configuration (independent primary power, possibly, and desirably, from different power panels, one possibly backed up by an uninterruptible power supply) by removing the IEC input power connector and physically and electrically connecting two input power cordsets, one to each of the redundant PSUs. However, this modification very likely invalidates the machine's UL Listing. Nevertheless, such a modification could implement a true N+1 redundancy configuration for the ANS 700s.

== Software ==
The Network Servers were sold exclusively with AIX, in a version called "AIX for Apple Network Servers" with some Apple-specific features, like AppleShare services, added; two revisions, 4.1.4 and 4.1.5, exist. Apple's own Unix variant A/UX had already been discontinued and does not support the PowerPC. Due to their AIX OS and hardware similarities, the Network Servers are mostly binary compatible with the RS/6000 series. However, applications which rely on early RS/6000's POWER2 processor and Micro Channel bus are incompatible with the ANS's PowerPC CPU and PCI bus.

During the development of the product, Apple tested alpha versions of Novell NetWare for PowerPC. Around the same time the hardware changed, the NetWare project ceased to be updated and later was abandoned. Apple also tested and produced limited numbers of ROM SIMMs which supported Windows NT for PowerPC on the Network Server 500 and 700.

As an alternative to AIX it is possible, though complicated, to install PowerPC Linux or NetBSD on the ANS. It is possible, with prototype Macintosh ROMs, to boot an Apple Network Server 500 or 700 into Mac OS 7.5 or later, however Ethernet support was not complete. No reliable sources for the procedure or requirements exist. Not only is the Ethernet different, but the display interface is as well. Using an Apple-branded, but DEC "Tulip" Ethernet card and a display card from a 9500 goes a long way towards achieving Mac OS capability but even this is not assured. Yellow Dog Linux 2.x or 3.x is more assured, and NetBSD 1.5.x might be even better. Major issues remain, such as the dual "Bandit" bus controllers, the proprietary floppy format, and possibly the CD-ROM. UW-SCSI hard disks are seldom an issue and Apple even released an U-SCSI (but narrow) hard disk installation kit for the ANS even though an ANS is normally only equipped with UW-SCSI disks.

== Status ==
Timeline of Macintosh servers
See also: List of Mac models

== See also ==
- PowerOpen Environment
