= Macintosh Quadra 610 =

Personal computer by Apple Computer

Centris 610 / Quadra 610 / Workgroup Server 60
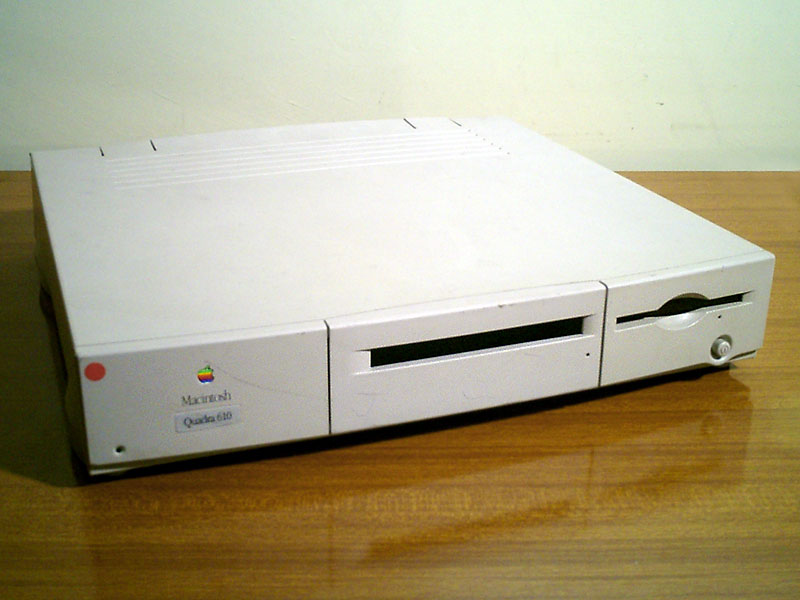
- A Macintosh Quadra 610
- Also known as: "Speedbump 610"
- Developer: Apple Computer
- Product family: Centris, Quadra, Workgroup Server
- Released: February 10, 1993
- Introductory price: US$2,520 (equivalent to $5,616 in 2025)
- Discontinued: July 18, 1994
- Operating system: System 7.1 – Mac OS 8.1; A/UX 3.0.1 – 3.1.1
- CPU: Motorola 68LC040 or 68040 @ 20 or 25 MHz
- Memory: 4 or 8 MB, expandable to 68 MB (80 ns 72-pin SIMM)
- Dimensions: Height: 3.4 inches (8.6 cm); Width: 16.3 inches (41 cm); Depth: 15.6 inches (40 cm)
- Weight: 14 pounds (6.4 kg)
- Predecessor: Macintosh IIsi
- Successor: Macintosh Quadra 630; Macintosh Quadra 660AV; Power Macintosh 6100; Workgroup Server 6150
- Related: Macintosh Quadra 650

The Macintosh Quadra 610, originally sold as the Macintosh Centris 610, is a personal computer designed, manufactured and sold by Apple Computer from February 1993 to July 1994. The Centris 610 was introduced alongside the larger Centris 650 as the replacement for the Macintosh IIsi, and it was intended as the start of the new midrange Centris line of computers. Later in 1993, Apple decided to follow an emerging industry trend of naming product families for their target customers – Quadra for business, LC for education, and Performa for home – and folded the Centris 610 into the Quadra family.

The 610 is the second Macintosh case design (after the Macintosh LC family) to use a pizza box form factor; it was later used for the Quadra 660AV and the Power Macintosh 6100. A server variant, the Workgroup Server 60, was introduced in July 1993 with a 20 MHz processor, which received the same 25 MHz upgrade in October.

In February 1994, a "DOS Compatible" version of the Quadra 610 was introduced as a way for Apple to judge whether the market would be interested in a Macintosh that could also run DOS, providing this DOS compatibility using an additional i486SX processor running at 25 MHz on a card installed in the Processor Direct Slot of the machine. The product was deemed a success by Apple, selling all 25,000 units that were produced within months of its launch. Having proven the demand for such capabilities, Apple developed a successor for the Power Macintosh 6100 and exhibited a "technology demonstration" of a card for the Quadra 630, although Apple indicated that follow-up products for earlier models might be delegated to third-party suppliers.

The Quadra 610 was replaced with the Quadra 630 in July 1994, and the Workgroup Server 6150 replaced the Workgroup Server 60 as Apple's entry-level server offering.

== Hardware ==
Standard equipment on all Centris/Quadra 610 models includes onboard video (with VGA support via an adapter), two ADB and two serial ports, and an external SCSI connector. There are two SIMM slots that support 4, 8, 16, and 32 MB SIMMs, allowing for a 68 MB of RAM. Ethernet-capable models have an AAUI port. There are no NuBus slots; an optional expansion card was offered that plugs into the Processor Direct Slot and allows a single 7-inch NuBus card to be installed in a horizontal orientation. However, this arrangement required use of the 68LC040 processor as there was insufficient clearance for the 68040 processor's required heat sink.

When the Centris 610 was first introduced, only a few 7-inch NuBus cards existed; most were 12 inches. The smaller size was part of an upcoming update to the NuBus standard.

System 7.1 was included as standard, with Mac OS 8.1 being the highest supported version. Versions with a full 68040 processor can also run A/UX with the appropriate Enablers.

== Models ==
Introduced February 10, 1993:

- Macintosh Centris 610: Sold in four configurations:
  - 68LC040 at 20 MHz, 4 MB RAM (on board), 512 KB VRAM (on board), 80 MB HDD, no Ethernet
  - 68LC040 at 20 MHz, 8 MB RAM (4 MB onboard + 4 MB SIMM), 512 KB VRAM (on board), 80 MB HDD, Ethernet
  - 68LC040 at 20 MHz, 8 MB RAM (4 MB onboard + 4 MB SIMM), 512 KB VRAM (on board), 230 MB HDD, Ethernet
  - 68LC040 at 20 MHz, 8 MB RAM (4 MB onboard + 4 MB SIMM), 1 MB VRAM (512 KB onboard + 512 KB SIMM), 230 MB HDD, Ethernet, AppleCD 300i and microphone

Introduced July 26, 1993:

- Workgroup Server 60: 68040 at 20 MHz, 8 MB ram (on board), 250 or 500 MB HDD. The 500 MB model was sold for US$2,699 as of early 1994.

Introduced October 21, 1993:

- Macintosh Quadra 610: 68LC040 or 68040 at 25 MHz, 160 or 230 MB HDD.

Introduced February 28, 1994:

- Macintosh Quadra 610 DOS Compatible: 68LC040 at 25 MHz, 8 MB RAM, 160 MB HDD; a DOS Compatibility Card occupies the PDS slot and includes an Intel 486SX-25 and has a 72-pin SIMM slot which supports up to 32 MB RAM.

== Timelines ==
Timeline of Macintosh Centris, LC, Performa, and Quadra models, colored by CPU type

See also: List of Mac models

Timeline of Macintosh servers
See also: List of Mac models
