= Workgroup Server 9150 =

Apple Workgroup Server model

- Apple Workgroup Server 9150/120
- Codename: Green Giant
- Developer: Apple Computer
- Product family: Apple Workgroup Server
- Released: May 2, 1994
- Introductory price: US$9,229 (equivalent to $20,047 in 2025)
- Discontinued: May 18, 1996
- Operating system: System 7.1.2 – Mac OS 9.1
- CPU: PowerPC 601 @ 80 or 120 MHz
- Memory: 8 MB, expandable to 264 MB (80 ns, 72-pin SIMM)
- Dimensions: 18.6 × 8.9 × 20.6 in (47 × 23 × 52 cm)
- Weight: 36.8 lb (16.7 kg)
- Predecessor: Workgroup Server 95
- Successor: Workgroup Server 9650
- Related: Power Macintosh 6100; Power Macintosh 7100; Power Macintosh 8100

The Workgroup Server 9150 is a server computer designed, manufactured, and sold by Apple Computer from May 1994 to May 1996. It was part of the first generation of Apple computers to use a PowerPC processor, developed by the AIM alliance of Apple, IBM, and Motorola. The 9150 was based on the Workgroup Server 95 but replaced its Motorola 68040 processor with a PowerPC 601. It was the only model in the Apple Workgroup Server family for which Apple did not release an equivalent desktop Macintosh model. Like other Workgroup Servers, it shipped with additional server software.

The 9150 used a modified Macintosh Quadra 950 case, with the floppy drive relocated to the lower portion of the front panel to make room for an internal DDS tape drive and CD-ROM drive. It retained the five-drive internal carrier of the Workgroup Server 95, supporting up to five internal hard drives. Its two SCSI buses supported up to 14 devices in total.

Apple introduced an upgraded 120 MHz version in April 1995, replacing the original 80 MHz model. The Workgroup Server 9150 was discontinued in May 1996. Apple introduced its successor in the server product family, the Workgroup Server 9650, in April 1997.

== Models ==
Both models have 8 MB onboard memory and are expandable to 264 MB through SIMM slots.

Introduced April 25, 1994:

- Workgroup Server 9150: 80 MHz, 512 KB L2 cache, 2× CD-ROM.

Introduced April 3, 1995:

- Workgroup Server 9150/120: 120 MHz, 1 MB L2 cache, 4× CD-ROM, additional 8 MB RAM SIMM included.

Timeline of Macintosh servers
See also: List of Mac models
