= Outrigger Macintosh =

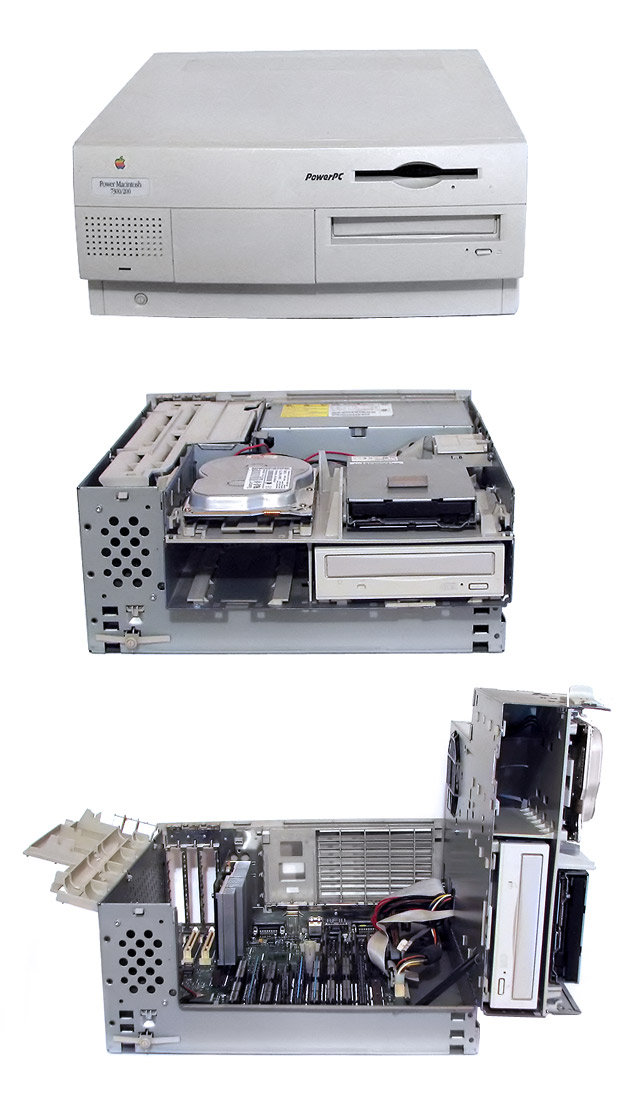
Unfolding the Outrigger case

The Outrigger is a Macintosh desktop computer case design introduced by Apple Computer in August 1995 with the Power Macintosh 7200 and Power Macintosh 7500. Apple subsequently used it for the Power Macintosh 7600, released in April 1996, the Power Macintosh 7300, released in February 1997, and the Power Macintosh G3 (Desktop), introduced in November 1997 and sold through December 1998.

The logic board is mounted at the bottom of the case, while the drive bays and power supply occupy a separate hinged assembly that folds outward and remains open when raised. This arrangement provides tool-free access to the processor (mounted on a daughtercard on some models) memory, video RAM, and drives. The PCI expansion slots are located along the left edge of the case behind a plastic shield and can be accessed without opening the hinged assembly. The case also allows users to upgrade memory, install PCI cards, and replace storage drives without tools in most cases.
