= Power Macintosh 8600 =

Type of personal computer by Apple

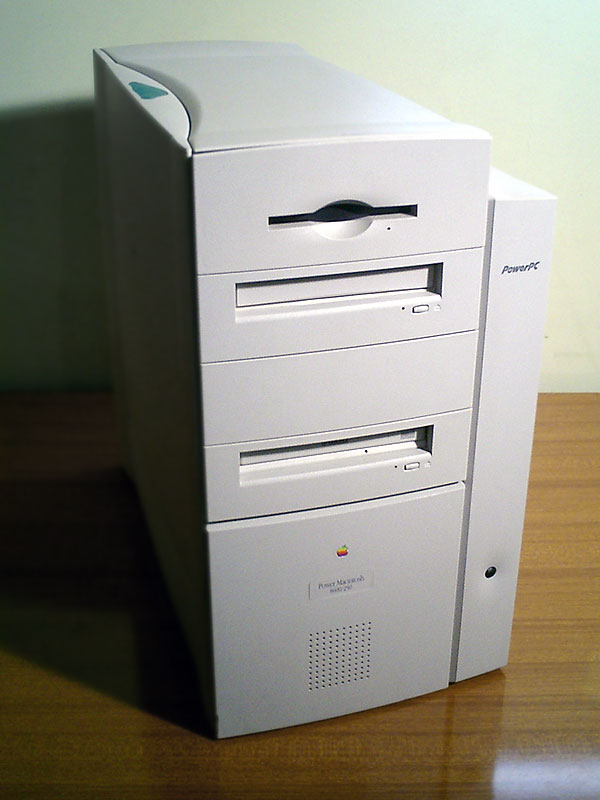
- A Power Macintosh 8600/250
- Developer: Apple Computer
- Product family: Power Macintosh
- Released: February 17, 1997
- Introductory price: US$2,700 (equivalent to $5,420 in 2025)
- Discontinued: February 17, 1998
- Operating system: System 7.5.5 – Mac OS 9.1
- CPU: PowerPC 604e @ 200 MHz; PowerPC 604ev @ 250 or 300 MHz
- Memory: 32 MB, expandable to 512 MB (70 ns 168-pin DIMM)
- Dimensions: Height: 17.3 inches (44 cm); Width: 9.7 inches (25 cm); Depth: 17.3 inches (44 cm)
- Weight: 35 pounds (16 kg)
- Predecessor: Power Macintosh 8500
- Successor: Power Macintosh G3 (Mini Tower)
- Related: Power Macintosh 7300; Power Macintosh 9600

The Power Macintosh 8600 is a personal computer designed, manufactured, and sold by Apple Computer from February 1997 to February 1998. Introduced alongside the Power Macintosh 7300 and Power Macintosh 9600, it initially featured a 200 MHz PowerPC 604e processor. The 8600 replaced the Power Macintosh 8500 and introduced a redesigned mini-tower enclosure that provided easier access to internal components and expansion slots. The design replaced the Macintosh Quadra 800-based enclosure used by its predecessor, which reviewers had criticized for making hardware upgrades difficult.

The 9600 used the same enclosure, but the 8600 had fewer expansion options, with eight RAM slots and three PCI slots compared with the 9600's 12 RAM slots and six PCI slots. It was positioned at a lower price than the 9600, continuing the distinction between the two product lines from the previous generation. The 8600 included RCA audio input and output, S-Video input and output, and composite video input and output. Compared with the 8500, it also featured a larger hard drive, a faster CD-ROM drive, and an optional factory-installed internal Zip drive, the first Apple computer to offer that as an option.

The 8600 initially experienced supply shortages and did not become widely available until June 1997, four months after its introduction.

A PC Compatibility Card could be installed in a PCI slot, adding a 166 MHz Intel Pentium processor, enabling the computer to run Microsoft Windows.

In August 1997, Apple replaced the original model with 250 and 300 MHz versions based on a new "Kansas" logic board. These speed-bumped versions also experienced supply shortages, although less extensive than the original model. Apple discontinued the 8600 in February 1998, several months after introducing its replacement, the Power Macintosh G3 mini-tower.

== Models ==
Introduced February 17, 1997:

- Power Macintosh 8600/200 – PowerPC 604e @ 200 MHz

Introduced August 5, 1997:

- Power Macintosh 8600/250 – PowerPC 604ev @ 250 MHz
- Power Macintosh 8600/300 – PowerPC 604ev @ 300 MHz

== Timeline ==
Timeline of Power Macintosh models
See also: List of Mac models
