= Power Macintosh 7500 =

Personal computer by Apple Computer

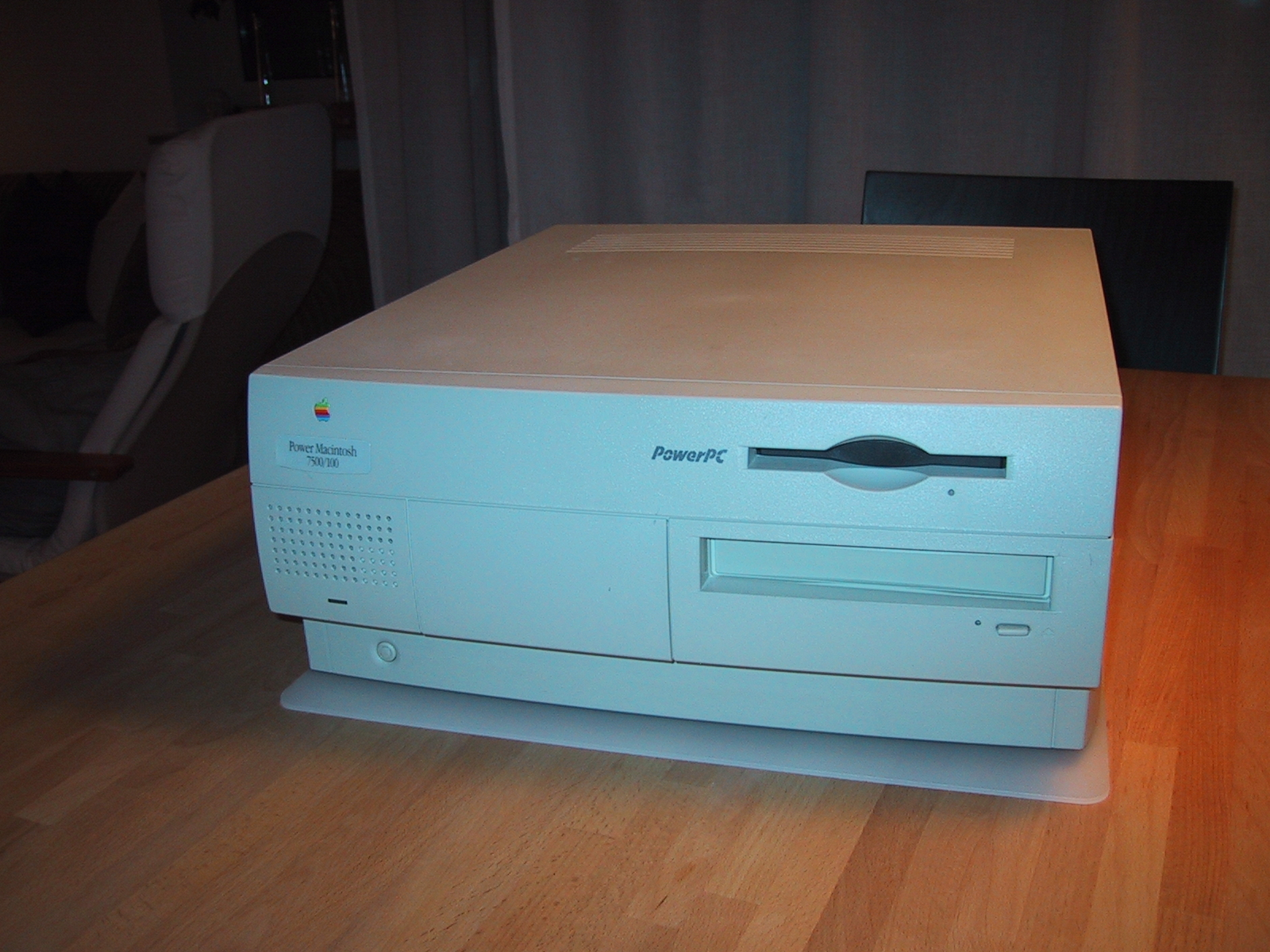
- A Power Macintosh 7500/100
- Also known as: "TNT"
- Developer: Apple Computer
- Product family: Power Macintosh, Outrigger Macintosh
- Released: August 8, 1995
- Introductory price: US$3,000 (equivalent to $6,339 in 2025)
- Discontinued: May 18, 1996
- Operating system: System 7.5.2 - Mac OS 9.1
- CPU: PowerPC 601 @ 100 MHz
- Memory: 8 or 16 MB, expandable to 1 GB (70 ns, 168-pin DIMM)
- Predecessor: Power Macintosh 7100
- Successor: Power Macintosh 7600
- Related: Power Macintosh 7200; Power Macintosh 8500

The Power Macintosh 7500 is a personal computer introduced by Apple Computer in August 1995 and sold until May 1996. It was the mid-range model in the second generation of the Power Macintosh line, between the entry-level Power Macintosh 7200 and high-end 8500.

Apple introduced the 7200, 7500 and 8500 at the 1995 MacWorld Expo in Boston, marketing them as the "Power Surge" line. The 7500 succeeded the Power Macintosh 7100 and used PCI expansion slots rather than NuBus. The 7500 shared the 7200's Outrigger case.

The Power Macintosh 7600 replaced the 7500 in May 1996.

== Hardware ==
The 7200, 7500 and 8500 were the first PCI-capable Macs manufactured by Apple; NuBus expansion cards are not supported. It has a PowerPC 601 processor rated at 100 MHz that is replaceable via a daughtercard. It also includes full composite video and S-Video input capability, but no output, as the 7500 was designed to be a video conferencing system, not a multimedia editing machine—this was the 8500's task.

The main bus runs at 45 MHz or 50 MHz (set by the CPU daughtercard), and the CPU at integer or half-integer multiples of this speed. The bus can be temperamental with sensitivity to different kinds of RAM or of L2 cache, which could cause problems with aftermarket CPU cards trying to increase the clock speed.

A PC Compatibility Card could be installed in the PCI card slot, adding a Intel Pentium (or compatible Cyrix) processor and enabling the computer to run Microsoft Windows.

== Models ==
In addition to the standard matrix of configurations available from Apple, various third-party resellers offered a wide variety of configurations.

- Power Macintosh 7500/100: 8 or 16 MB RAM, 512 MB or 1 GB HDD, AppleCD 600i 4x CD-ROM drive.

== Timeline ==
Timeline of Power Macintosh models
See also: List of Mac models
