= Power Macintosh 7200 =

Personal computer by Apple Computer

Power Macintosh 7200 / 7215 / 8200 / Workgroup Server 7250
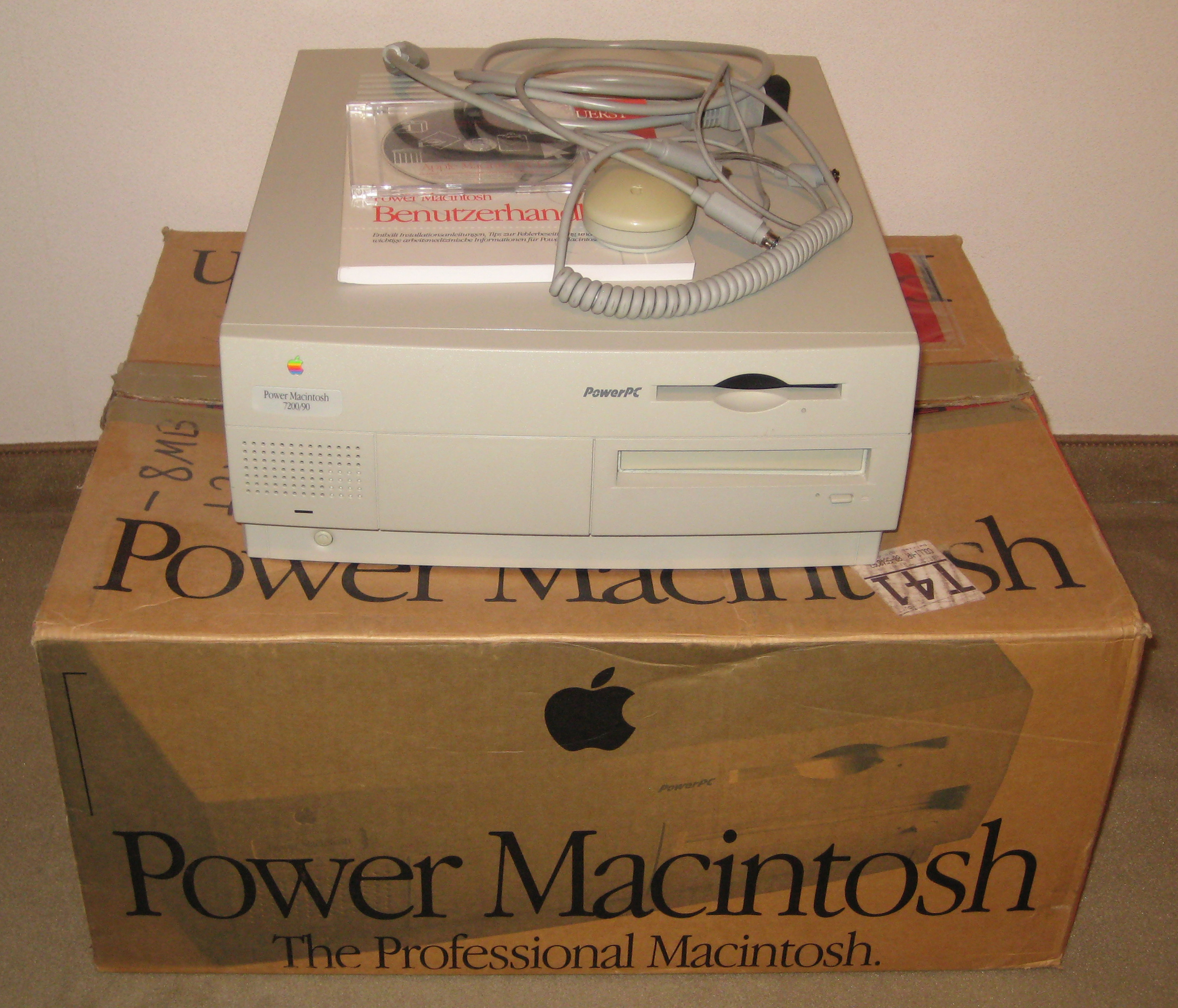
- A Power Macintosh 7200/90
- Also known as: "Catalyst"
- Developer: Apple Computer
- Product family: Power Macintosh, Workgroup Server, Outrigger Macintosh
- Released: August 8, 1995
- Introductory price: US$1,700 (equivalent to $3,592 in 2025)
- Discontinued: February 17, 1997
- Operating system: System 7.5.2 – Mac OS 9.1
- CPU: PowerPC 601 @ 75, 90, 100 or 120 MHz
- Memory: 8 MB, expandable to 512 MB (70 ns, 168-pin DIMM)
- Dimensions: 6.15 × 14.37 × 16.93 in (156 × 365 × 430 mm)
- Weight: 22 lb (10.0 kg)
- Predecessor: Power Macintosh 6100
- Successor: Power Macintosh 4400
- Related: Power Macintosh 7500; Power Macintosh 8500

The Power Macintosh 7200 is a personal computer introduced by Apple Computer in August 1995 and sold until February 1997. It was the entry-level model in the second generation of the Power Macintosh line, below the mid-range Power Macintosh 7500 and high-end 8500. A mini-tower variant, marketed in Europe as the Power Macintosh 8200, was sold alongside the 7200. The 90 MHz 7200 was marketed in Japan as the Power Macintosh 7215, while the 120 MHz version with bundled server software was marketed as the Workgroup Server 7250.

Apple introduced the 7200, 7500 and 8500 at the 1995 MacWorld Expo in Boston, marketing them as the "Power Surge" line. The 7200 succeeded the Power Macintosh 6100 and used PCI expansion slots rather than NuBus. The 7200 shared the 7500's Outrigger case. The 8200 used the Quadra 800 mini-tower case.

At launch, the 7200 was available with 75 MHz and 90 MHz processors. Apple replaced the 75 MHz model with a 120 MHz model in February 1996.

A "PC Compatible" version of the 120 MHz model was offered with a pre-installed PC Compatibility Card in a PCI card slot with a 100 MHz Pentium processor, allowing it to run MS-DOS and Windows 95.

The Power Macintosh 4400 replaced the 7200 as the entry-level Power Macintosh in February 1997, at which time it was the last remaining PowerPC 601-based system in Apple's lineup.

== Upgrades ==
Unlike other Power Macintosh machines of the time, the CPU is soldered to the motherboard instead of on a daughterboard. This presented a challenge for users who wanted to upgrade to a faster processor. At the time of its introduction, Apple promised an inexpensive logic board upgrade to the 7500, but due to high demand for the 7500, this never materialized. When the upgrade was finally made available, it was to the follow-on model, the Power Macintosh 7600, and came in the form of a complete logic board replacement. The base price was $1,300 and upgraded the system to a 120 MHz CPU, but did not include L2 cache.

The 7200's CPU was considered otherwise impossible to upgrade until, over three years after the 7200 was discontinued, Sonnet eventually produced an G3 upgrade card for the PCI slots.

== Models ==
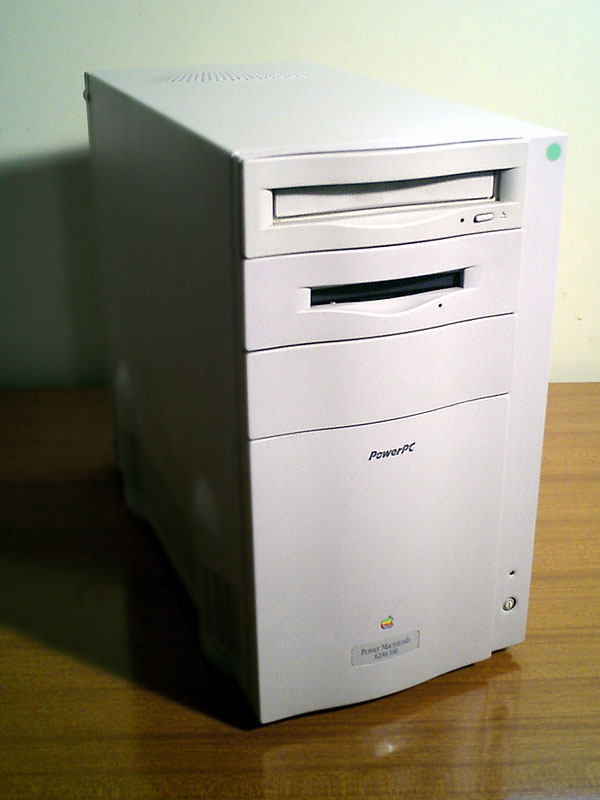
Power Macintosh 8200/100, the 7200 in a mini-tower case

Introduced August 8, 1995:

- Power Macintosh 7200/75
- Power Macintosh 7200/90

Introduced January 11, 1996:

- Power Macintosh 7215/90

Introduced February 26, 1996:

- Workgroup Server 7250/120

Introduced April 22, 1996:

- Power Macintosh 7200/120
- Power Macintosh 7200/120 PC Compatible – bundled with a PC Compatibility Card
- Power Macintosh 8200/100
- Power Macintosh 8200/120

Timeline of Power Macintosh models
See also: List of Mac models

Timeline of Macintosh servers
See also: List of Mac models
