= Power Macintosh 9600 =

Personal computer by Apple Computer

Power Macintosh 9600 / Workgroup Server 9650
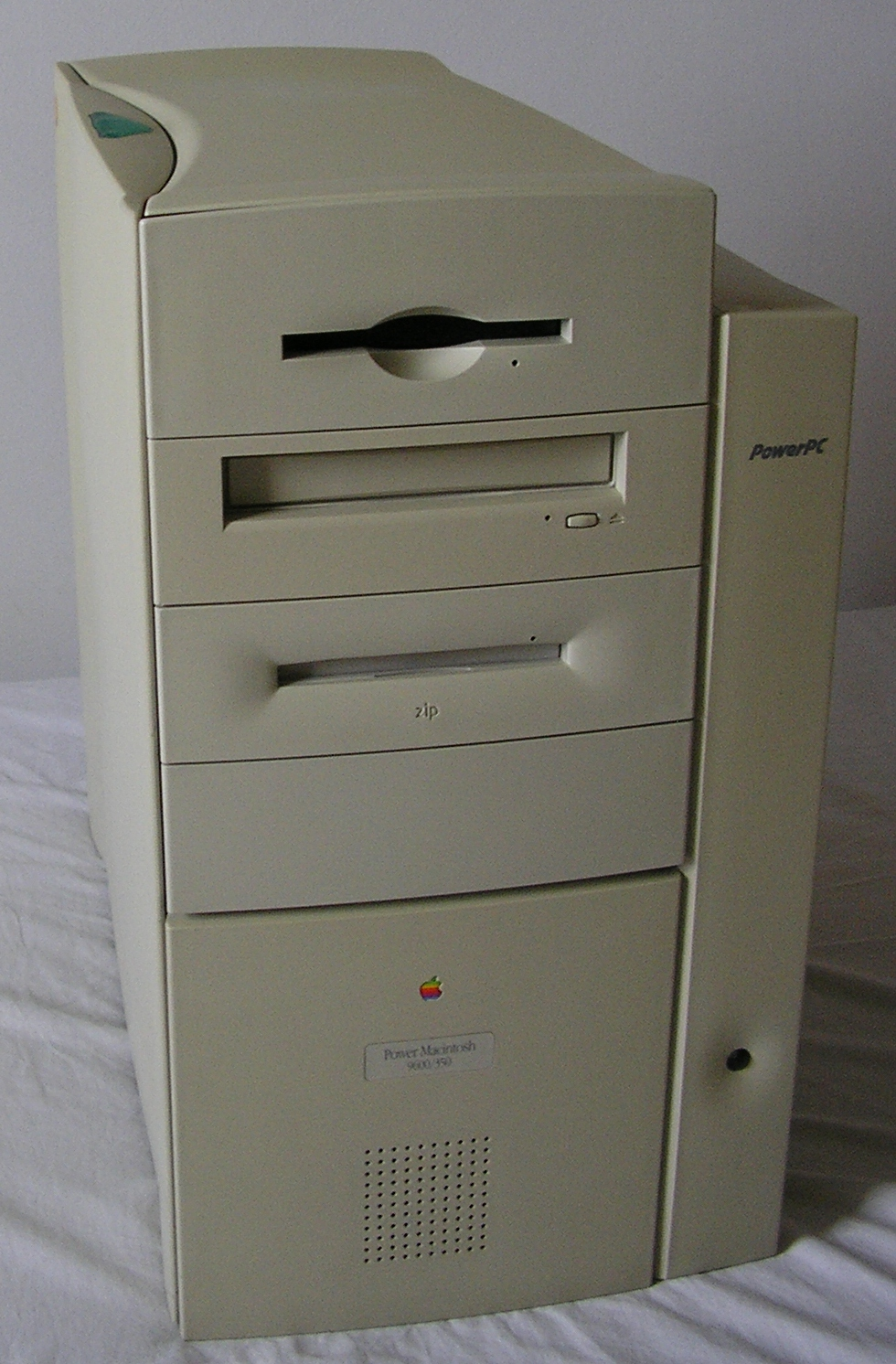
- Developer: Apple Computer
- Product family: Power Macintosh
- Released: February 17, 1997
- Introductory price: US$3,700 (equivalent to $7,420 in 2025)
- Discontinued: March 17, 1998
- Operating system: System 7.5.5 - Mac OS 9.1
- CPU: PowerPC 604e, 200×1–2 and 233 MHz; PowerPC 604ev, 300 and 350 MHz
- Memory: 32 MB, expandable to 1.5 GB (70 ns 168-pin DIMM)
- Predecessor: Power Macintosh 9500; Workgroup Server 9150
- Successor: Power Macintosh G3 (Mini Tower)
- Related: Power Macintosh 7300; Power Macintosh 8600

The Power Macintosh 9600 (also sold with additional server software as the Apple Workgroup Server 9650) is a personal computer that is a part of Apple Computer's Power Macintosh series of Macintosh computers. It was introduced in February 1997 alongside the Power Macintosh 7300 and 8600, and replaced the Power Macintosh 9500 as Apple's flagship desktop computer.

The 9600 was replaced by the Power Macintosh G3 Mini Tower in Apple's product lineup in November 1997, with sales of the 9600 continuing until March 1998.

== Models ==
When introduced, the Power Macintosh 9600 was available with three processor configurations: single-processor 200 MHz, dual-processor 200 MHz, and single-processor 233 MHz. The line was updated in August 1997 with a single-processor 300 MHz or 350 MHz "Mach 5" 604ev with a larger L2 cache, priced at $4,500 and $5,300, respectively. An updated Workgroup Server 9650 was introduced at the same time with a 350 MHz CPU, and could be ordered pre-configured as an application server, AppleShare server or Internet server, with prices ranging from $6,800 to US$7,500 depending on the software package chosen.

The 350 MHz model was initially discontinued in October due to CPU supply problems, but reintroduced on February 17, 1998 when the 300 MHz model was discontinued in favor of the new Power Macintosh G3 Mini Tower. While the G3 was faster, its expandability was only on par with the 8600, so the 9600 was kept available until March for users that required it.

== Hardware ==
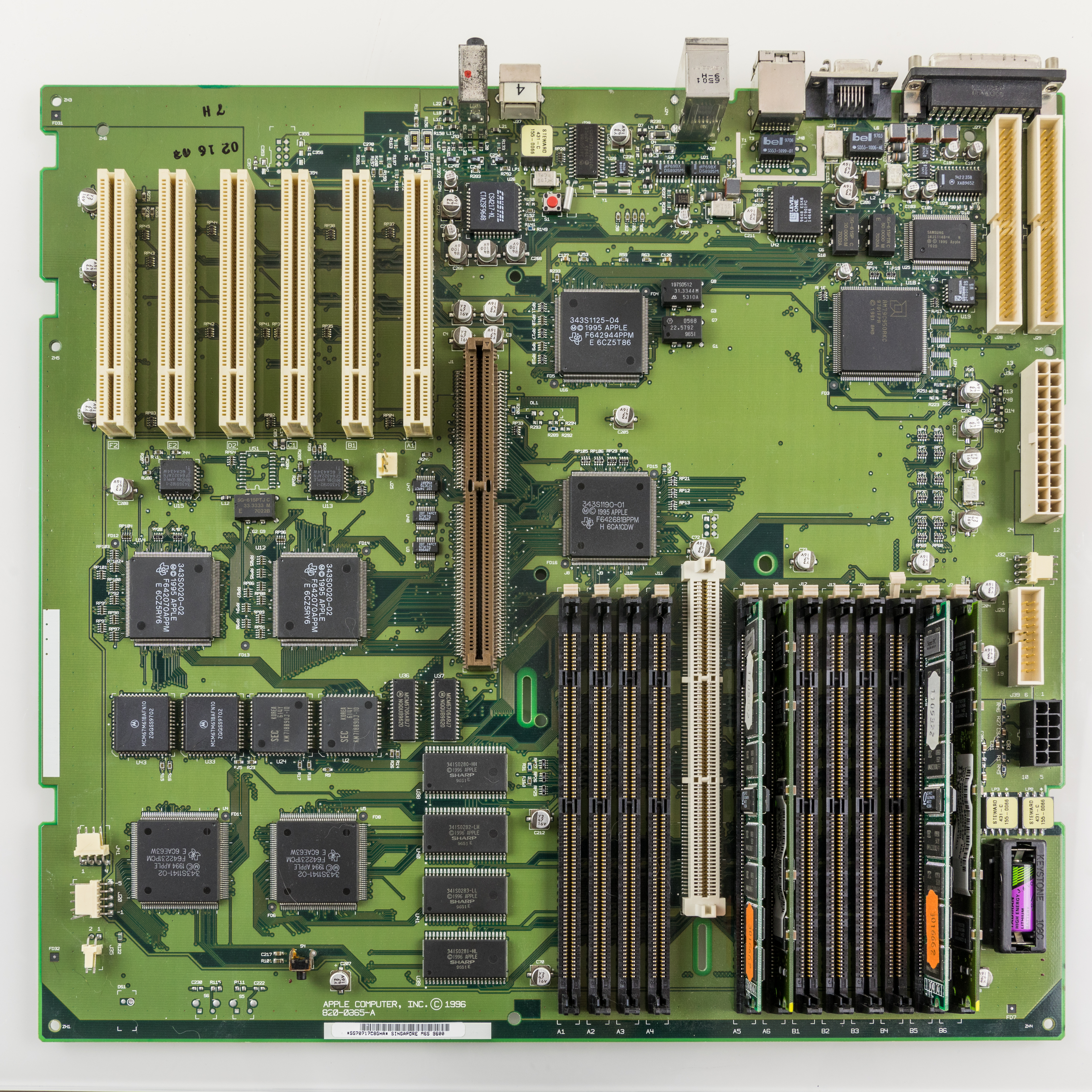
The "Tsunami" logic board the Power Macintosh 9600 inherited from the Power Macintosh 9500

The 9600 came in a new case identical to the 8600, but was internally similar to the 9500 that preceded it, with 12 memory slots and 6 PCI expansion card slots instead of the 8 memory and 3 PCI slots on the 8600. The 9600 used the new PowerPC 604e CPU, an enhanced version of the 9500 604.

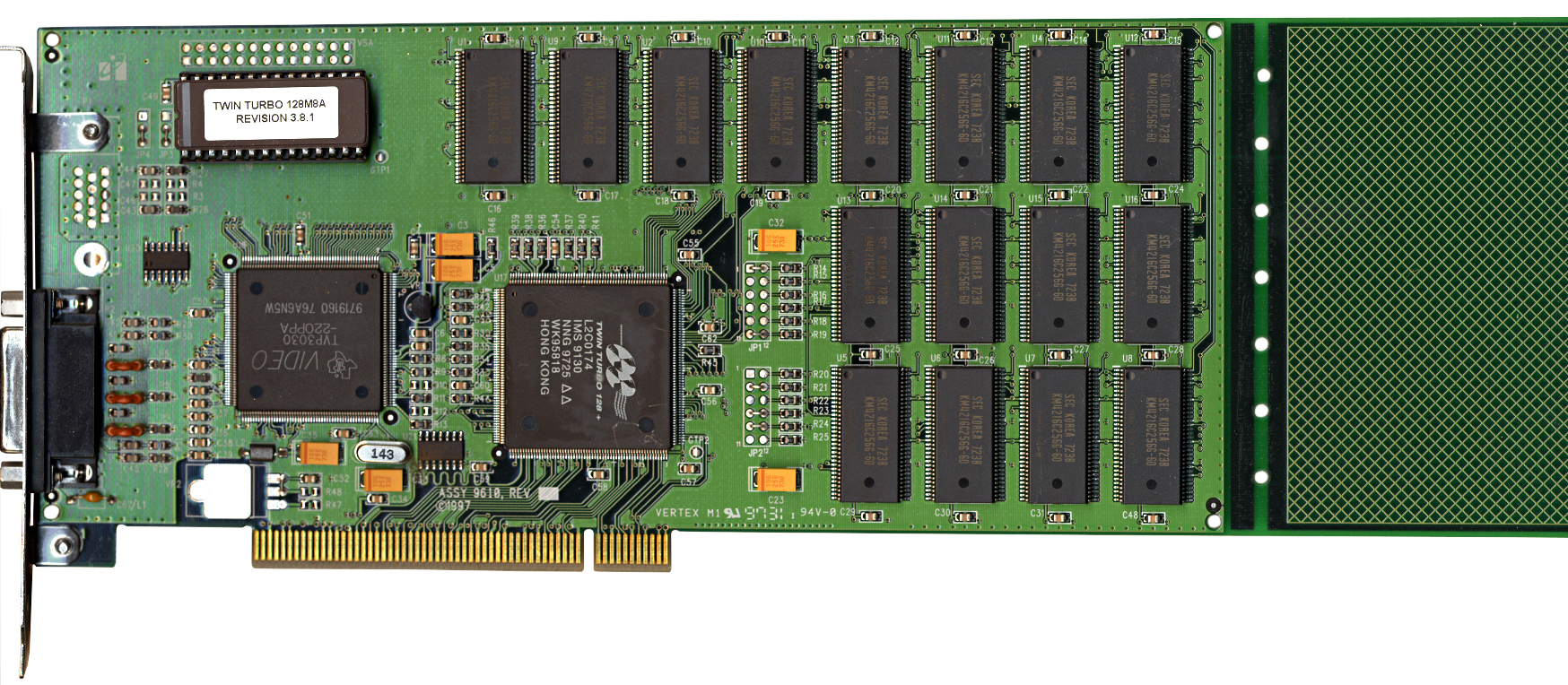
IMS IXMICRO TwinTurbo 128 video card

Like its predecessor, the Power Macintosh 9600 has no built-in video; instead, it shipped with an 8 MB IXMICRO TwinTurbo 128-bit PCI video card installed.

The Power Macintosh 9600/350 was the most powerful Mac ever in Apple's four-digit model numbering system, the last multiprocessor Mac for three years, and the last model with six or more expansion slots until the 2019 Mac Pro. No version of OS X was officially supported by Apple on the 9600; its installation and use required the use of the third-party software solution XPostFacto. Mac OS X 10.3 or 10.4 was only possible with a G3 processor upgrade installed, and OS X 10.5 was possible with a G4 upgrade. The 9600 was part of the final generation of Macs to ship with a SCSI hard drive as a standard feature; subsequent Macs adopted IDE for the internal hard drive bus.

A PC Compatibility Card could be installed in the PCI card slot, adding a Intel Pentium (or compatible Cyrix) processor and enabling the computer to run Microsoft Windows.

== Technical specifications ==
According to Apple, all of these models are obsolete. (Note: Apple products that have been discontinued for 7 years and no longer receive hardware support or spare parts)

Model		9600/200	9600/200MP	9600/233	9600/300	9600/350
Timeline	Introduced	February 17, 1997			August 5, 1997	
Timeline	Discontinued	August 5, 1997			February 17, 1998	March 17, 1998
Model	Model	M5433				
Model	Order number	M5456	M4952	M5883	M5901	M5906
Model	Cost	US$3,699	US$4,699	US$3,699	US$4,599	US$5,399
Performance	Processor	PowerPC 604e	Dual PowerPC 604e	PowerPC 604e	PowerPC 604ev	
Performance	Clock speed	200 MHz		233 MHz	300 MHz	350 MHz
Performance	CPU cache	64 kB L1; 512 kB L2			64 kB L1; 1.0 MB L2	
Performance	Front side bus	50 MHz		46.6 MHz	50 MHz	
Performance	Memory	32 MB 168-pin DIMM; Official Maximum 768 MB; Actual Maximum 1.5 GB			64 MB 168-pin DIMM; Official Maximum 768 MB; Actual Maximum 1.5 GB	
Performance	Graphics	Twin Turbo 128 with 4 MB EDO SGRAM			Twin Turbo 128 with 8 MB EDO SGRAM	
Storage	Hard drive	4 GB SCSI				
Storage	Optical drive	12× CD-ROM			24× CD-ROM	
Connectivity	Networking	AAUI, 10BASE-T				
Connectivity	Expansion	6 × PCI slots, 3 × 5.25" bays, 3 × 3.5" bays, floppy bay				
Operating System	Initial	System 7.5.5			System 7.6.1	
Operating System	Latest	Mac OS 9.1				
Dimensions and weight		17.3 in × 9.7 in × 17.3 in (44 cm × 25 cm × 44 cm); 35 lbs (15.9 kg)				

== Timeline ==
Timeline of Power Macintosh models
See also: List of Mac models
