= Power Macintosh 8500 =

Personal computer by Apple Computer

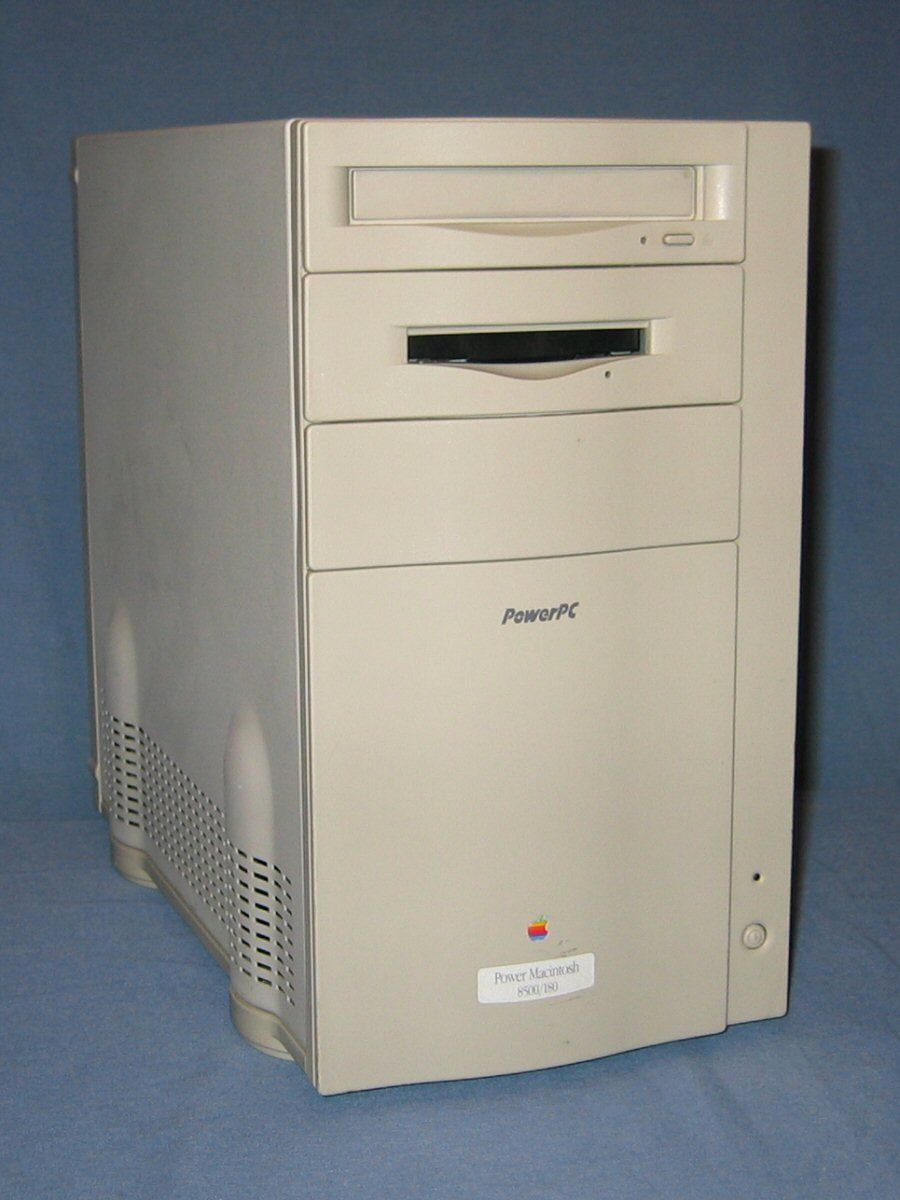
- The Power Macintosh 8500/180
- Also known as: Power Macintosh 8515 and WGS 8550
- Developer: Apple Computer
- Product family: Power Macintosh
- Released: August 8, 1995
- Introductory price: US$3,999 (equivalent to $8,450 in 2025)
- Discontinued: February 17, 1997
- Operating system: 7.5.2 - Mac OS 9.1
- CPU: PowerPC 604, 120–150 MHz; PowerPC 604e, 180 or 200 MHz
- Memory: 16 MB, expandable to 512 MB (Apple), 1024 MB (actual), (70 ns 168-pin FPM or EDO DIMM)
- Predecessor: Power Macintosh 8100
- Successor: Power Macintosh 8600

The Power Macintosh 8500 is a personal computer designed, manufactured and sold by Apple Computer from August 1995 to February 1997. Billed as a high-end graphics computer, the Power Macintosh 8500 was initially released with a 120 MHz PowerPC 604, and unlike earlier Power Macintosh machines, the CPU was mounted on an upgradeable daughtercard. Though slower than the 132 MHz Power Macintosh 9500, the first-generation 8500 featured several audio and video (S-Video and composite video) in/out ports not found in the 9500. In fact, the 8500 incorporated near-broadcast quality (640×480) A/V input and output and was the first personal computer to do so, but no hard drive manufactured in 1997 could sustain the 18 MB/s data rate required to capture video at that resolution. Later, special "AV" hard drives were made available that could delay thermal recalibration until after a write operation had completed. With special care to minimize fragmentation, these drives were able to keep up with the 8500's video circuitry.

The 8500 was introduced alongside the Power Macintosh 7200 and 7500 at the 1995 MacWorld Expo in Boston. Apple referred to these machines collectively as the "Power Surge" line, communicating that these machines offered a significant speed improvement over its predecessors. Infoworld Magazine's review of the 8500 showed a performance improvement in their "business applications suite" from 10 minutes with the 8100/100, to 7:37 for the 8500/120. They also noted that the 8500 run an average of 24 to 44 percent faster than a similarly clocked Intel Pentium chip, with the performance nearly double on graphics and publishing tasks.

A PC Compatibility Card could be installed in the PCI card slot, adding a Intel Pentium (or compatible Cyrix) processor and enabling the computer to run Microsoft Windows.

The 8500's CPU was updated twice during its production run. It originally shipped with a 120 MHz PowerPC 604, later with the same chip running at 150 MHz, and finally with a PowerPC 604e running at 180 MHz. It was succeeded by the Power Macintosh 8600 in February 1997.

== Models ==
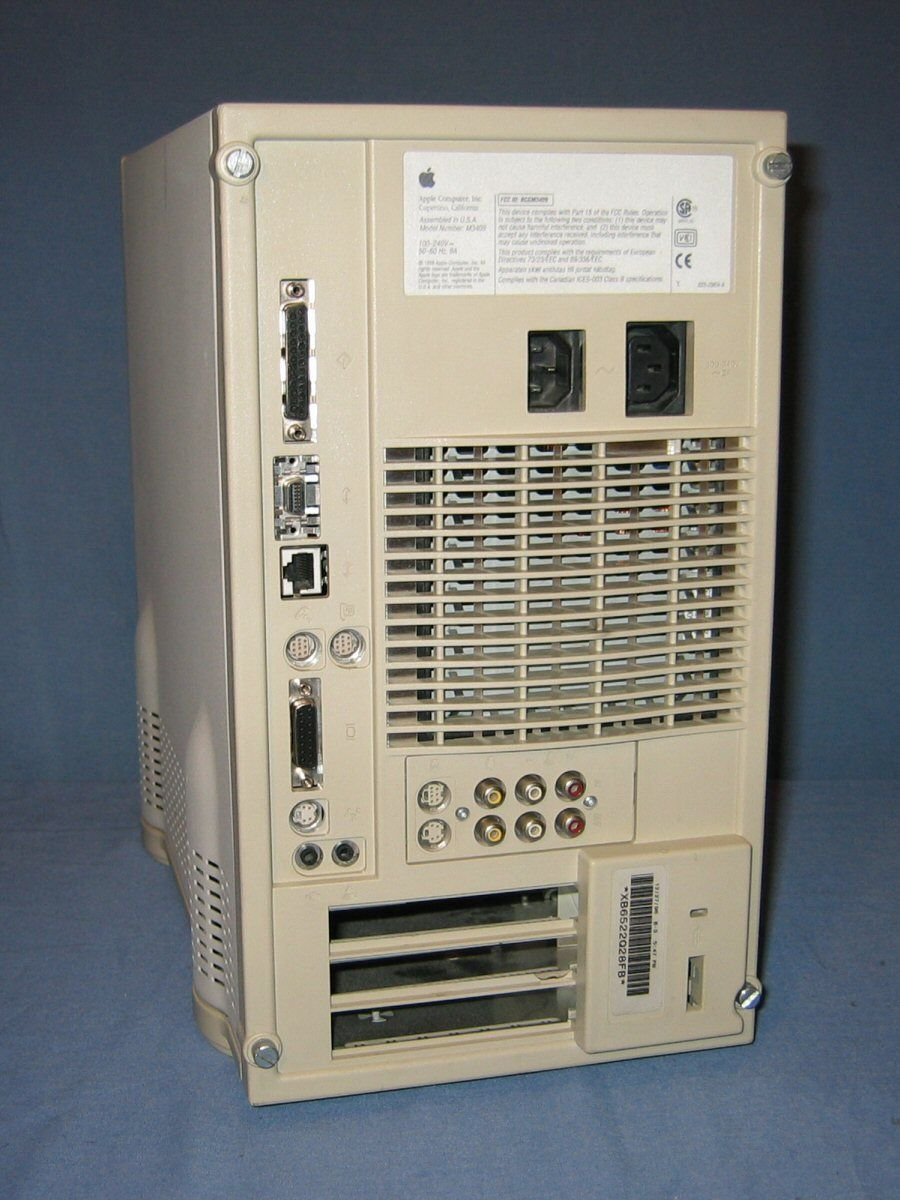
Rear view of the Power Macintosh 8500/180

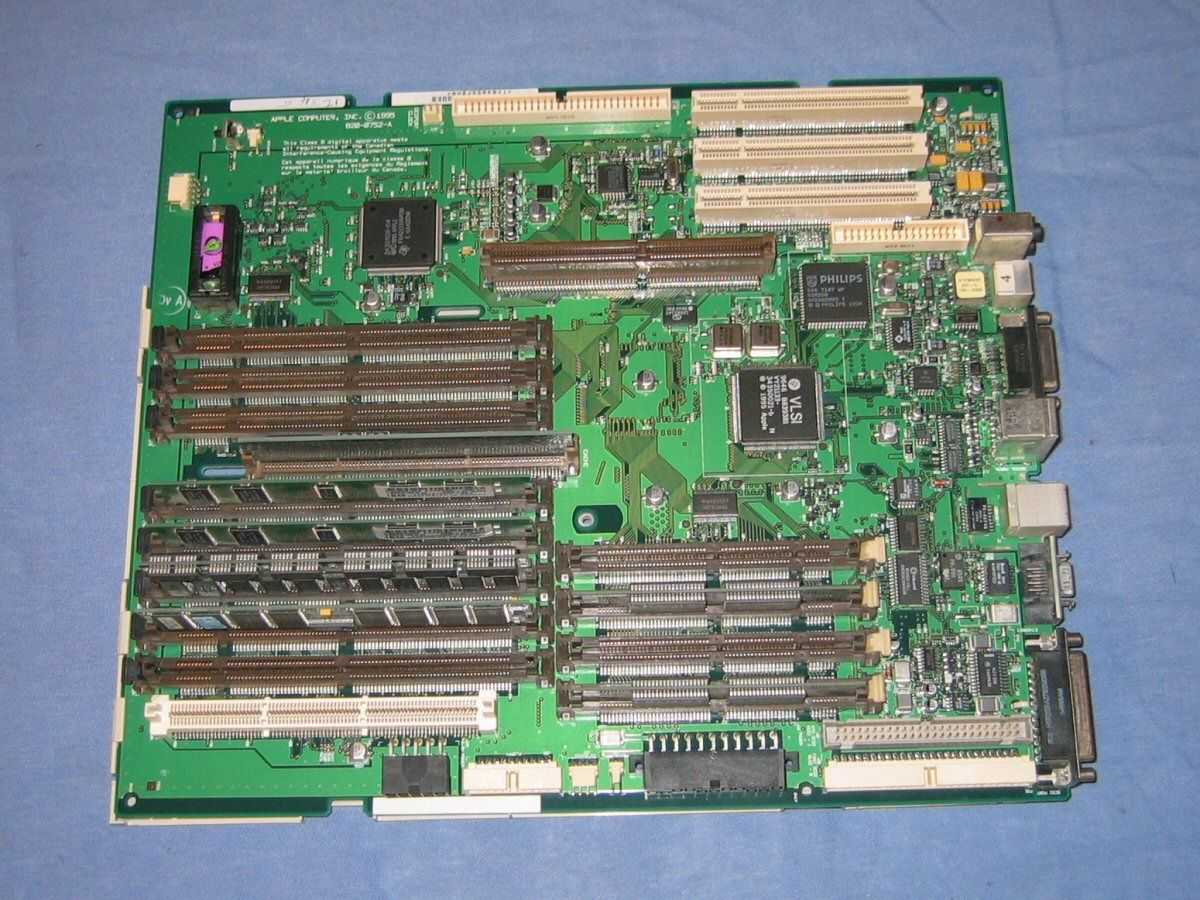
The Power Macintosh 8500/180's logic board

Introduced August 8, 1995:

- Power Macintosh 8500/120

Introduced January 11, 1996:

- Power Macintosh 8515/120

Introduced February 26, 1996:

- Workgroup Server 8550/132

Introduced April 22, 1996:

- Power Macintosh 8500/132
- Power Macintosh 8500/150

Introduced August 5, 1996:

- Power Macintosh 8500/180

Introduced September 9, 1996:

- Workgroup Server 8550/200 200 MHz PowerPC 604e CPU, 32 MB RAM. US$5,799. Sold with one of three software bundles, titled "Application Server Solution", "Apple Internet Server Solution 2.1", and "AppleShare Server Solution".

== Timeline ==
Timeline of Power Macintosh models
See also: List of Mac models
