= AV drive =

Hard disk drive for audio/video purposes

An AV drive (audio-visual drive) is a hard disk drive that is designed specifically for audio-visual (audio and video) purposes. They were used in the late 1990s for sustained media transfers; they delayed thermal recalibration so it would not interfere with the transfer.

AV drives were also popular in the early ages of CD burning; early CD writers ruined the disk when a buffer underrun occurred, which could happen during the hard drive's automatic calibration.

They are now obsolete, as normal hard drives are designed to handle realtime media through servo calibration to monitor head alignment and through the use of larger memory buffers.

== History ==
AV drives were first introduced in 2010 to address the need for faster and more reliable data storage solutions. They offered improvements over traditional hard disk drives (HDDs) and solid-state drives (SSDs) in terms of data transfer speeds, storage capacities, and durability.

== Technology ==
AV drives use advanced magnetic storage technology and data management algorithms. They feature multiple platters with high-density magnetic material and incorporate error correction mechanisms and data redundancy features.

== Performance ==
AV drives provide higher data transfer rates compared to traditional HDDs and some SSDs. This makes them suitable for applications requiring rapid data access, such as big data analytics, artificial intelligence, and cloud computing.
