= Power Macintosh 9500 =

Personal computer by Apple Computer

Power Macintosh 9500 / Power Macintosh 9515
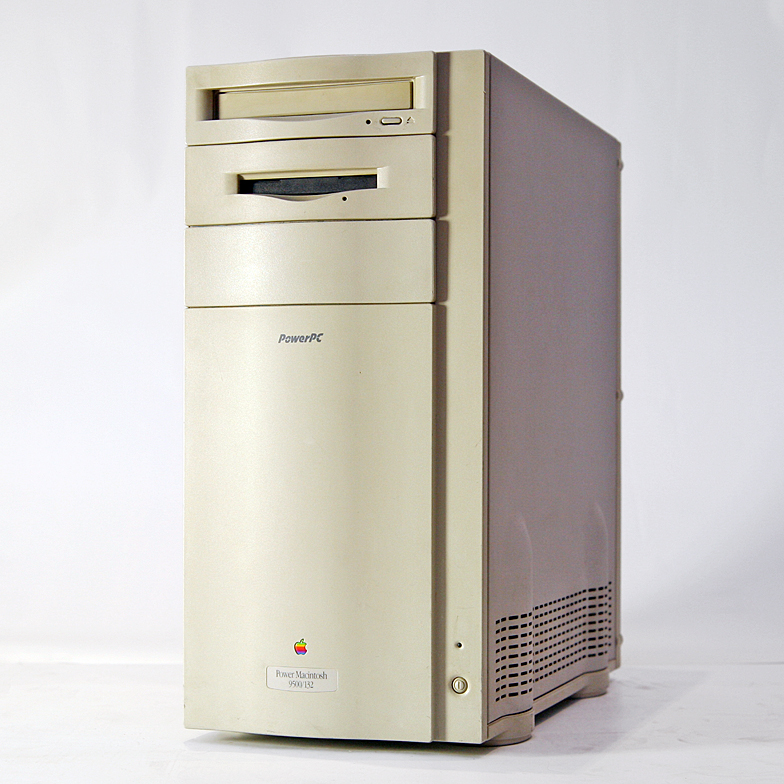
- A Power Macintosh 9500/132
- Also known as: Power Macintosh 9515 and WGS 9550
- Developer: Apple Computer
- Product family: Power Macintosh
- Released: June 19, 1995
- Introductory price: US$4,699 (equivalent to $9,929 in 2025)
- Discontinued: February 17, 1997
- Operating system: System 7.5.2 - Mac OS 9.1
- CPU: PowerPC 604, 120–150 MHz; PowerPC 604e, 180×2 and 200 MHz
- Memory: Expandable to 1.5 GB (168 pin DIMM 5V)
- Dimensions: Height: 16.9 inches (43 cm); Width: 7.7 inches (20 cm); Depth: 15.75 inches (40.0 cm)
- Weight: 28 pounds (13 kg)
- Predecessor: Macintosh Quadra 950
- Successor: Power Macintosh 9600

The Power Macintosh 9500 (additionally sold as Power Macintosh 9515 in some regions of Europe and Asia) is a personal computer designed, manufactured and sold by Apple Computer from June 1995 to February 1997. It is powered by a PowerPC 604 processor, a second-generation PowerPC chip that is faster than the PowerPC 601 chip used in the Power Macintosh 8100. The 180MP and 200 MHz models, introduced August 1996, use the enhanced PowerPC 604e processor. The 9500 uses a taller version of the case originally used in the Quadra 800 and Power Macintosh 8100.

MacWorld Magazine gave the 9500 a positive review, concluding that it is "not the second-generation Power Mac for the rest of us — it's too pricey .... but it is an excellent foundation for a high-end graphics workstation — for color publishing or media production. Its speed and expandability should also made it popular in the scientific and technical markets." Their benchmarks showed that the 9500 outperformed the Quadra 950 when running older Mac software in the Mac 68k emulator, posting speeds almost twice as fast as the Quadra 900.

The 9500 was replaced by the Power Macintosh 9600, which had minimal technical changes, but provided a new case and faster processor speeds.

== Hardware ==
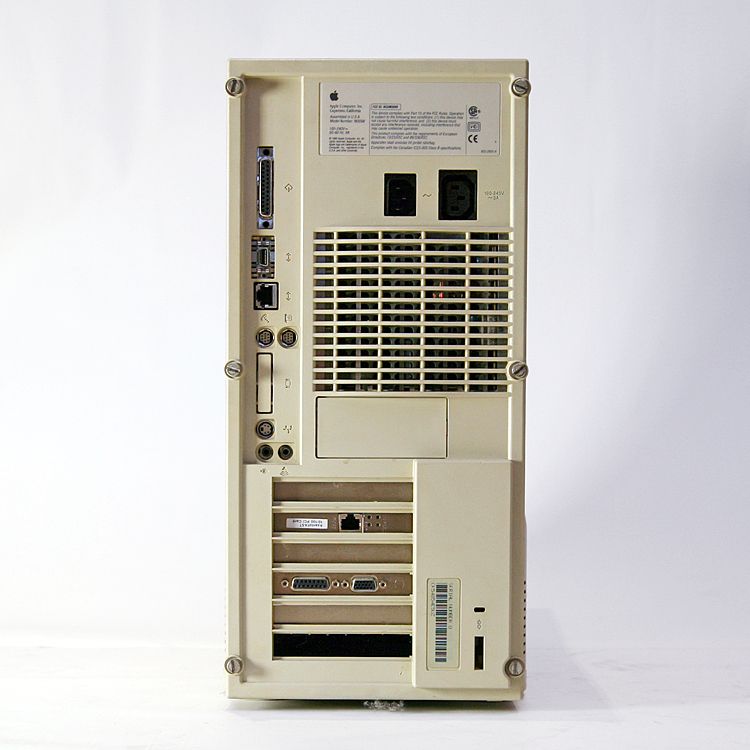
Rear view of a Power Macintosh 9500/132.

The 9500 includes several technological firsts for Apple. The CPU is connected via a daughterboard, and so can be swapped easily. Processor cards available were Single-processor versions ranging from 120 to 200 MHz, and a dual processor card with two 180 MHz CPUs. This is also the first Macintosh to use the PCI standard, with six PCI slots available—one of which must be used for a graphics card. Infoworld's Anita Epler noted that "Because most multimedia developers don't use the onboard video found on previous Mac models, Apple wisely economized by simply leaving it out. Users can purchase their own PCI graphics card or opt for Apple's 64-bit accelerated PCI video board with 2 MB of VRAM as an optional accessory."

The 9500 is also the first computer from Apple to support 168-pin DIMM memory modules, and the 512 KB of on-board 128-bit-wide cache utilizes copy-back instead of write-through, offering faster speeds than prior Macintosh models, as well as the ability to install single modules (although matched pairs are recommended for best performance). The logic board has a total of 12 memory slots; like the Power Macintosh 8100, installing memory requires removing the logic board from the case. When it was introduced, 64 MB DIMMs were the largest available on the market, making for a maximum memory limit of 768 MB. Companies like Advantage Memory were selling DIMMs of this size for US$3,900 each. 128 MB DIMMs were introduced later in 1995, offering a theoretical limit of 1.5 GB memory, though System 7.5.2 is unable to use more than 1 GB of memory.

Some other firsts for a Macintosh include a regular 10BASE-T Ethernet port alongside the AAUI port, as well as support for the new SCSI-2 Fast standard, and a 4× CD-ROM.

A PC Compatibility Card could be installed in the PCI card slot, adding a Intel Pentium (or compatible Cyrix) processor and enabling the computer to run Microsoft Windows.

The basic design of the logic board, called "Tsunami", was used by various Macintosh clone makers as a reference design and a modified version was used in the non-Macintosh Apple Network Server series. The Tsunami board was later reused with minor modifications in earlier variants of the Power Macintosh 9600, although later replaced with an updated "Kansas" variant for 300 and 350 MHz variants.

Utilizing a third-party G4 CPU upgrade and the XPostFacto installation utility it is possible to run up to Mac OS X v10.5 "Leopard" on a 9500, making it the oldest model capable of running Mac OS X.

== Models ==
Included as standard with all models are 16 MB RAM, 1 GB HDD, and AppleCD 600i 4x CD-ROM.

Introduced June 19, 1995:

- Power Macintosh 9500/120
- Power Macintosh 9500/132: 132 MHz CPU, 2 GB HDD.

Introduced October 2, 1995:

- Power Macintosh 9515/132: Same as the 9500/132, sold in Europe and Asia.

Introduced April 22, 1996:

- Power Macintosh 9500/150: 150 MHz CPU, 16 or 32 MB RAM, 2 GB HDD.

Introduced August 7, 1996:

- Power Macintosh 9500/180MP: Two 180 MHz PowerPC 604e CPUs, 16 or 32 MB RAM, 2 GB HDD, AppleCD 1200i 8x CD-ROM.
- Power Macintosh 9500/200: 16 or 32 MB RAM, 2 GB HDD, AppleCD 1200i 8x CD-ROM.

== Timeline ==
Timeline of Power Macintosh models
See also: List of Mac models
