= Power Macintosh 7600 =

1996 Apple computer

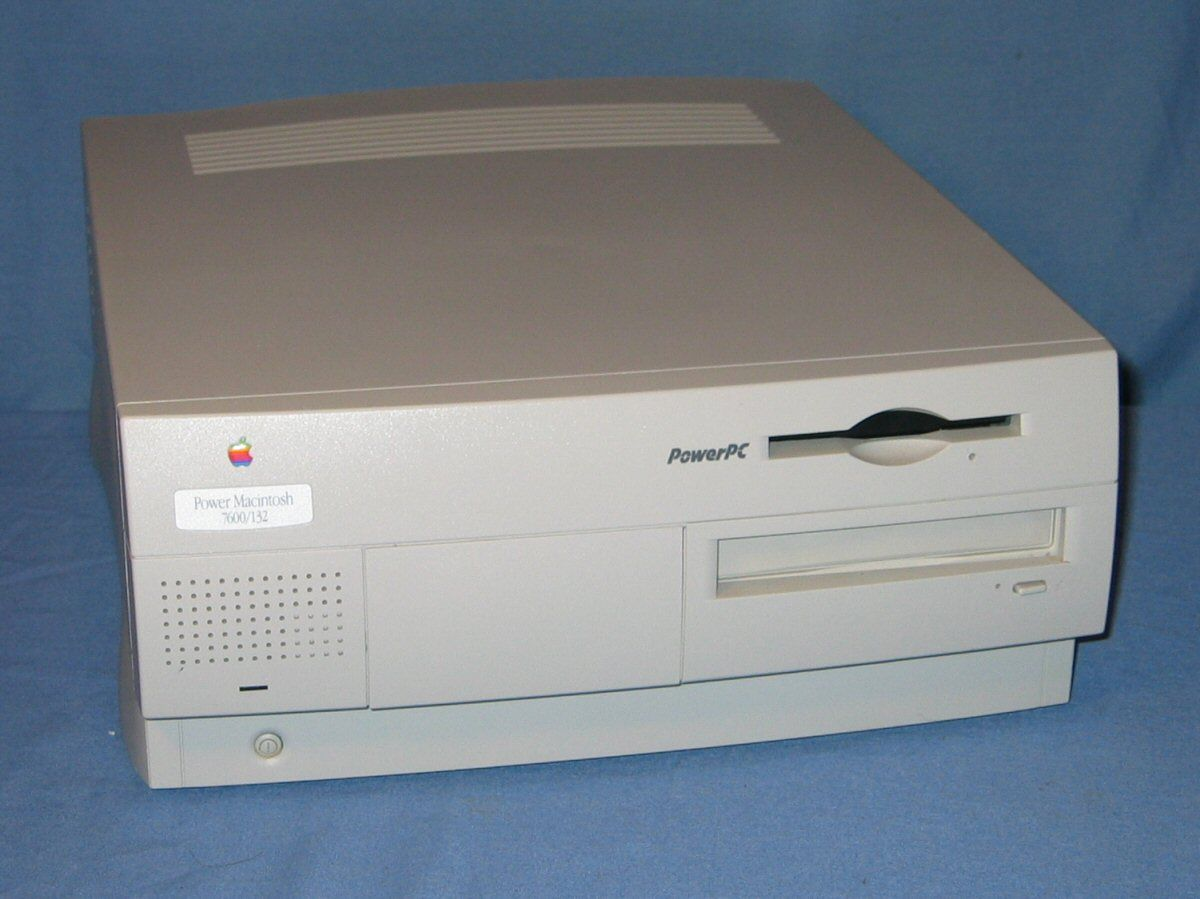
- A Power Macintosh 7600/132
- Developer: Apple Computer
- Product family: Power Macintosh, Outrigger Macintosh
- Released: April 1, 1996
- Introductory price: US$2,999 (equivalent to $6,156 in 2025)
- Discontinued: November 17, 1997
- Operating system: System 7.5.3 – Mac OS 9.1
- CPU: PowerPC 604 @ 120 or 132 MHz; PowerPC 604e @ 200 MHz
- Memory: 16 or 32 MB, expandable to 1 GB (70 ns, 168-pin DIMM)
- Predecessor: Power Macintosh 7500
- Successor: Power Macintosh 7300

The Power Macintosh 7600 is a personal computer designed, manufactured, and sold by Apple Computer from April 1996 to November 1997. It succeeded the Power Macintosh 7500 as Apple's mid-range model, replacing its PowerPC 601 processor with a more powerful PowerPC 604 running at 120, 132, or 200 MHz. Like the 7500, it included Apple's AV features, including RCA audio input and output, S-Video input, and composite video input. It used the "Outrigger" desktop case introduced with the 7500.

In November 1997, Apple replaced the 7600 with the Power Macintosh 7300 as its mid-range offering.

A PC Compatibility Card could be installed in a PCI slot, adding an Intel Pentium (or compatible Cyrix processor) and enabling the computer to run Microsoft Windows.

== Models ==
The Power Macintosh 7600 was released in three configurations. The U.S. models used a PowerPC 604 processor running at 120 or 132 MHz, while a 200 MHz PowerPC 604e version was sold exclusively in Japan. All models included 256 KB of L2 cache, three PCI expansion slots, and built-in 10BASE-T Ethernet and AAUI networking ports. Apple specified a maximum memory capacity of 512 MB, although configurations with up to 1 GB of RAM were also possible.

Introduced April 1, 1996:

- Power Macintosh 7600/120: PowerPC 604 processor at 120 MHz; 16 MB of RAM; 1.2 GB SCSI hard drive; and 4× CD-ROM drive.

Introduced August 3, 1996:

- Power Macintosh 7600/132: PowerPC 604 processor at 132 MHz; 16 MB of RAM; 1.2 GB SCSI hard drive; and 8× CD-ROM drive.

Introduced February 2, 1997:

- Power Macintosh 7600/200 (Japan only): PowerPC 604e processor at 200 MHz; 32 MB of RAM; 2 GB SCSI hard drive; and 12× CD-ROM drive.

== Timeline ==
Timeline of Power Macintosh models
See also: List of Mac models
