= AppleCD =

Line of CD-ROM drives by Apple Computer

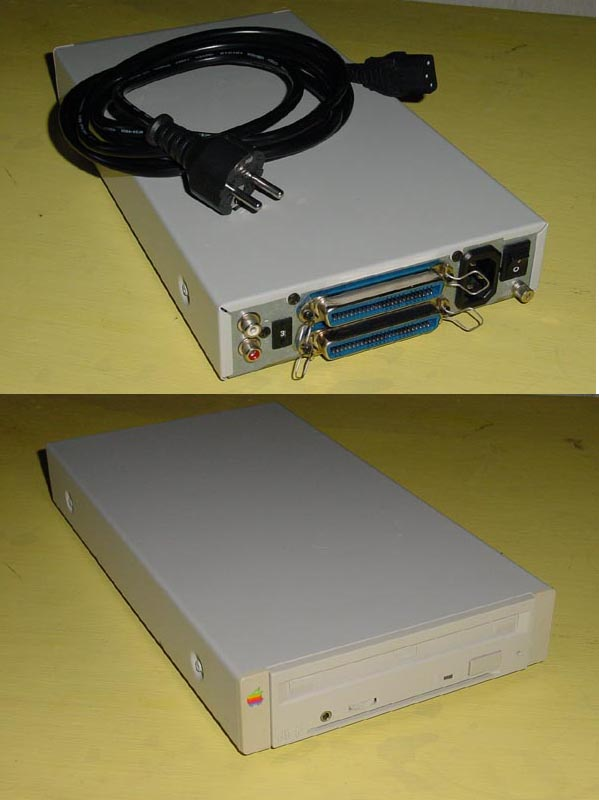
AppleCD 300, shown from the back (top) and front (bottom)

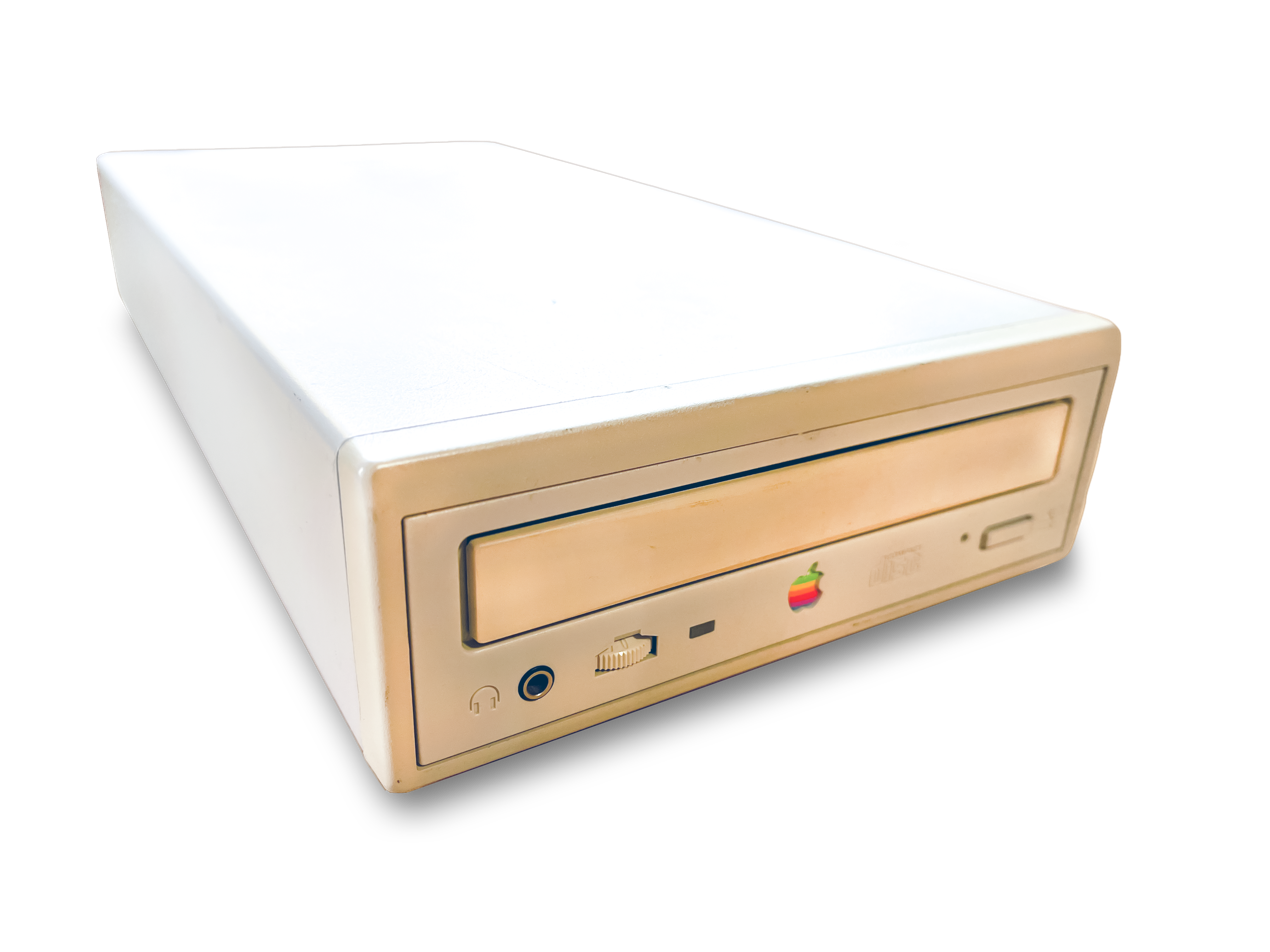
AppleCD 600e

AppleCD is a range of SCSI-based CD-ROM drives for Mac personal computers, manufactured and sold by Apple Computer from the late 1980s to late 1990s. Earlier AppleCD drives required a CD caddy in order to be used, while later models used a tray-loading mechanism. The original model introduced in 1988 was simply called the AppleCD SC. There was also a version of the CD drive that did not have the Apple logo.

== AppleCD SC ==
The AppleCD SC was the first CD-ROM by Apple Computer, introduced in 1988. It originally contained a fan but in 1990 they removed it because it was unneeded and attracted dust onto the optical disk head which could cause problems. It uses a front-loading caddy 1x CD-ROM and is only capable of Read Only Media. This accessory device was only able to read compact discs up to a 650 MB capacity in five formats, CD-Audio, CD-ROM, HFS, ProDOS, and High Sierra. On the front of the device it has an eject button, mini-phono sound out jack, and a volume knob. On the rear it has a power switch, power input, two Centronics 50-pin SCSI outputs, and an audio RCA connector. With appropriate software it would run on any Mac with a DB-25 connector, or an Apple II with an Apple II SCSI interface card.

== AppleCD SC Plus ==
The AppleCD SC Plus was Apple Computer's second CD-ROM drive, a replacement for the AppleCD SC which was introduced in 1991. Identified as model number M3021, just like its predecessor, the AppleCD SC, it used a 1x Read Only Media CD-ROM drive. The Plus could read a CD with up to 750 MB of data over the 650 MB of the AppleCD SC. It had indicator lights, an eject button, mini-phone audio jack, volume knob, and the CD caddy drive on the front of the accessory. On the back there were two 50-pin Centronics SCSI connectors, audio RCA connectors, power input, and a power switch. The AppleCD SC Plus had only minor improvements over the AppleCD SC and it was relatively the same.

Several other models were made, including the 150, 300, 300e, 300i Plus, 300e Plus, 600i, 600e Plus and 1200i ('e' representing an external drive, and 'i' representing internal; model number also represents data reading speed in KB/s). They all include two Centronics 50-pin SCSI ports, and require mains power.
