= Macintosh IIvi =

Personal computer by Apple

Macintosh IIvi / Performa 600
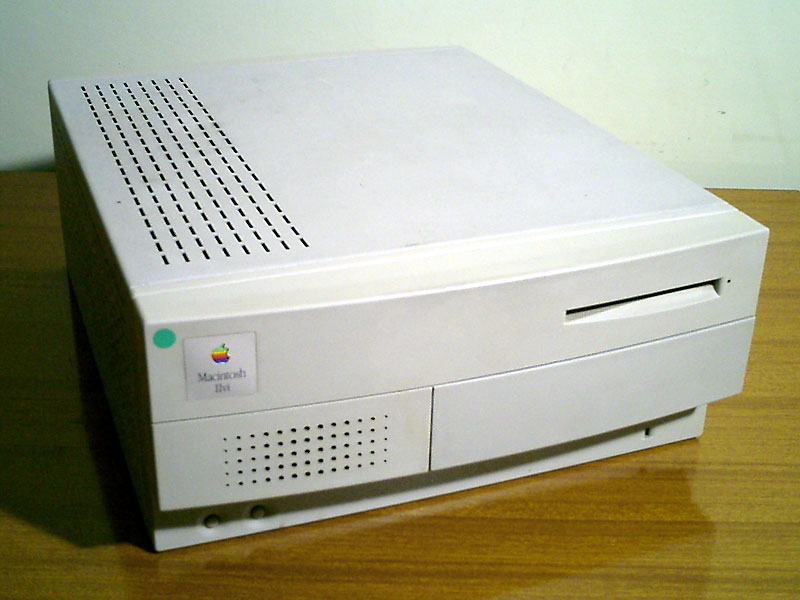
- Developer: Apple Computer
- Product family: Macintosh II, Performa
- Released: September 14, 1992 (Performa); October 19, 1992 (IIvi)
- Introductory price: US$3,000 (equivalent to $6,883 in 2025)
- Discontinued: February 10, 1993 (IIvi); October 18, 1993 (Performa)
- Operating system: System 7.1 - Mac OS 7.6.1
- CPU: Motorola 68030 @ 16 MHz (IIvi) or 32 MHz (Performa)
- Memory: 4 MB, expandable to 68 MB (80 ns 30-pin SIMM)
- Dimensions: Height: 6 inches (15 cm); Width: 13 inches (33 cm); Depth: 16.5 inches (42 cm)
- Weight: 25 pounds (11 kg)
- Successor: Macintosh Centris 650
- Related: Macintosh IIvx

The Macintosh IIvi (also sold as the Macintosh Performa 600) is a personal computer designed, manufactured, and sold by Apple Computer from September 1992 to February 1993. The IIvi was introduced alongside the Macintosh IIvx (which added an FPU, a RAM cache and had its processor clocked at twice the speed of the IIvi while the data bus was still at the same speed)). The Performa 600 models, meanwhile, are the IIvi with the IIvx's 34 MHz CPU. The IIvi was, on some benchmarks, faster than the IIvx. It is the only model in the Macintosh II family to be branded as a Performa.

This model was discontinued four months after its introduction, when the Centris 650 was introduced at a similar price point.

== Models ==
All models include three NuBus slots and a Processor Direct Slot (PDS).

The Performa 600 models were formally introduced on September 14; shipments were delayed until October to coincide with the introduction of the IIvi and IIvx.

Introduced September 14, 1992:

- Macintosh Performa 600: 32 MHz 68030, 4 or 5 MB RAM, 512 KB VRAM, 160 MB HDD. Shipped with the Apple Extended Keyboard II and a microphone.
- Macintosh Performa 600CD: 5 MB RAM, 1MB VRAM, 160 MB HDD, 2× AppleCD CD-ROM. Shipped with the Apple Extended Keyboard II and a microphone.

Introduced October 19, 1992:

- Macintosh IIvi: 16 MHz 68030. Sold in South America, Europe, and Japan, but not the United States. Could be configured with 40, 80, 160 or 400 MB HDD.

== Timelines ==
Timeline of Macintosh II family models

Timeline of Macintosh Centris, LC, Performa, and Quadra models, colored by CPU type

See also: List of Mac models
