= Gulftown =

Hyperthreaded Intel processor

General information
- Launched: 1H 2010
- Designed by: Intel
- CPUID code: 0206Cx
- Product code: 80613, 80614

Performance
- Max. CPU clock rate: 3.2 GHz to 3.46 GHz

Physical specifications
- Cores: 6 (physical), 12 (logical)
- Package: LGA-1366

Cache
- L2 cache: 6 × 256 KB
- L3 cache: 12 MB

Architecture and classification
- Application: UP/DP Server, Workstation, Gaming
- Technology node: 32 nm
- Microarchitecture: Westmere
- Instruction set: x86, x86-64, MMX, SSE, SSE2, SSE3, SSSE3, SSE4.1, SSE4.2, AES-NI

Products, models, variants
- Brand names: Core i7-970, 980, 980X, 990X; Xeon 3600s, 5600s

History
- Successor: Sandy Bridge-E

Gulftown or Westmere-E is the codename of an up to six-core hyperthreaded Intel processor able to run up to 12 threads in parallel. It is based on Westmere microarchitecture, the 32 nm shrink of Nehalem. Originally rumored to be called the Intel Core i9, it is sold as an Intel Core i7. The first release was the Core i7 980X in the first quarter of 2010, along with its server counterpart, the Xeon 3600 and the dual-socket Xeon 5600 (Westmere-EP) series using identical chips.

== Processor ==
First figures indicate that at equivalent clock rates, depending on the software, it has up to 50% higher performance than the identically clocked quad-core Bloomfield Core i7-975. Despite having 50% more transistors, the CPU strongly benefits from the 32-nm process, drawing the same or even less power (depending on the operating system) than its Bloomfield predecessors with merely four cores. The thermal design power (TDP) of all planned models is stated to be 130 watts.

Westmere-EP is the first six-core dual-socket processor from Intel, following the quad-core Bloomfield and Gainestown (also known as Nehalem-EP) processors using the same LGA 1366 package, while the earlier Dunnington six-core processor is a Socket 604 based multi-socket processor. The CPUID extended model number is 44 (2Ch) and two product codes are used, 80613 for the UP desktop/server models and 80614 for the Xeon 5600-series DP server models. In some models, only four of the six cores are enabled.

Since 2014, Xeon 3600 and 5600 series Westmere-EP processors became somewhat sought after as an upgrade route for older X58 motherboards. In some cases, motherboard BIOS revisions have allowed the installation of these six core processors onto boards originally targeted for two or four core processors In fully threaded workloads, total system performance will increase by a value equal to the number of cores added (i.e. moving from a four core 2.6 GHz to a six core 2.6 GHz system would deliver 50% more multithreaded performance). With proper BIOS support and the correct supporting components, many users have reported substantial overclocking potential, often as high as 4.4 GHz while staying within Intel's maximum allowed voltages (no higher than 1.35v for the core or the uncore)

== Overview ==
Brand Name (list)	Cores	L3 Cache	Socket	TDP	I/O Bus
Core i7-990X	6	12 MB	LGA 1366	130 W	QuickPath
Core i7-980X	6	12 MB	LGA 1366	130 W	QuickPath
Xeon 36xx	6	12 MB	LGA 1366	130 W	QuickPath
Xeon 56xx	2-6	12 MB	LGA 1366	40-130 W	QuickPath

== See also ==
- List of Macintosh models grouped by CPU type
