= Macintosh IIvx =

Personal computer by Apple

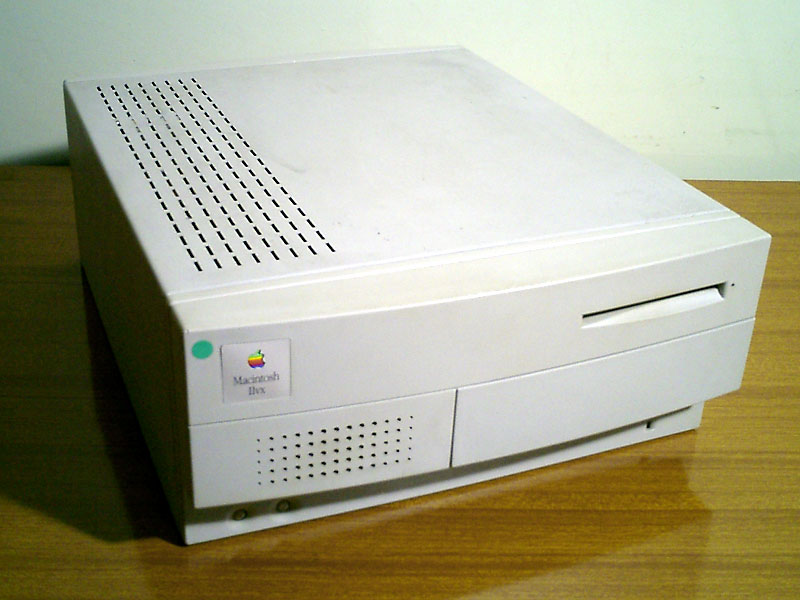
- Developer: Apple Computer
- Product family: Macintosh II, Centris
- Released: October 19, 1992
- Introductory price: US$2,950 (equivalent to $6,610 in 2024)
- Discontinued: October 21, 1993
- Operating system: System 7.1 - Mac OS 7.6.1
- CPU: Motorola 68030 @ 32 MHz
- Memory: 4 MB, expandable to 68 MB (80 ns 30-pin SIMM)
- Dimensions: Height: 6 inches (15 cm); Width: 13 inches (33 cm); Depth: 16.5 inches (42 cm)
- Weight: 25 pounds (11 kg)
- Successor: Macintosh Centris 650, Quadra 605
- Related: Macintosh IIvi

The Macintosh IIvx is a personal computer designed, manufactured and sold by Apple Computer from October 1992 to October 1993. It is the last of the Macintosh II family of Macintosh computers. The IIvx was introduced at the same time as the slower Macintosh IIvi, with both models using the same metal case design as the earlier Performa 600 and Performa 600CD. Like the Performa 600CD, the IIvx could be equipped with an internal double-speed CD-ROM drive.

== Hardware ==
The Mac IIvx began its life in development as a proof-of-concept to see how an internal CD-ROM drive could be added to a Mac. But after Apple CEO John Sculley gave a speech at MacWorld Tokyo promising a Mac with a CD-ROM drive, the IIvx was rushed into production. Several shortcuts were taken in its design; most notably, its 32 MHz Motorola 68030 processor was crippled by a 16 MHz bus, making it slightly slower than the popular but aging Macintosh IIci. Its serial port was limited to 57.6 kbit/s, which could cause problems with serial connections and MIDI hardware. The Macintosh IIvi (a slower version of the IIvx with a 16 MHz processor) was introduced at the same time in some markets (though not the United States) but discontinued four months later. Representing the high end of the original Performa lineup, the Performa 600 was also based on the same architecture. The IIvx was one of the only Macintosh II models with a 32K L2 cache, following the IIfx's onboard 32K cache and the IIci's optional 32K cache card; neither the IIvi nor the Performa 600 supported an L2 cache, despite their similarities to the IIvx.

The IIvx was sold with hard drives ranging in capacity from 40 to 400 MB, three NuBus slots, and a Processor Direct Slot.

The case for the Macintosh IIvx and Macintosh IIvi (Performa 600) would later be used for the Centris 650, Quadra 650 (the speed-bumped refresh of the Centris 650), and Power Macintosh 7100. The IIvx can be upgraded to Centris/Quadra 650 by swapping the logic board.

== Reception and replacement ==
Upon release the IIvx was described in a MacWorld magazine review as having "the best price-to-performance ratio of any computer Apple has ever built." The list price for a machine with an 80 MB hard drive, 4 MB main memory, and 512 KB of video memory was US$2,949. Adding the CD-ROM and upgrading to 5 MB of main memory and 1 MB video memory increased the price to US$3,219, which Macworld deemed to be "the best CD-ROM drive bargain ever offered".

While the IIvx was released as part of the Macintosh II family, Apple originally intended the IIvx to be the first computer in the Macintosh Centris line. According to Apple, their lawyers were unable to complete the trademark check on the "Centris" name in time for the release of this computer so it ended up being sold as the IIvx. Machines bearing the Centris name were introduced a few months later, ending up all Centris models were powered by the 68040 or 68LC040 so the IIvx with its 68030 was never rebranded as a Centris. Notably, the Macintosh Centris 650 was released in February 1993 with an entry-level configuration that was $250 less than the IIvx's starting price in October 1992, so then Apple then slashed the IIvx's base price by more than a third to prevent obsolescence. Because of increasing competition from Dell and other IBM PC compatible manufacturers who were offering the Intel i486DX (the equivalent to the 68040), prices of the IIvx continued to fall quickly; by the end of June 1993, the price of the 5/80 + CD-ROM configuration had dropped to $1,799, about half its original price. For a while afterwards, people who bought an expensive Mac that quickly became outdated were said to have been "IIvx-ed".

The IIvx was discontinued in October 1993, alongside the rebranding of Centris models to Quadra, and the release of the Quadra 605 (also sold as the LC 475 and Performa 475). The Quadra 605 was Apple's most affordable model to have the 68LC040 (upgradable to the 68040 which includes FPU), but was not a direct replacement in form nor price to the IIvx.

== Timelines ==
Timeline of Macintosh II family models

Timeline of Macintosh Centris, LC, Performa, and Quadra models, colored by CPU type

See also: List of Mac models
