= Macintosh Quadra 900 =

Personal computer by Apple Computer

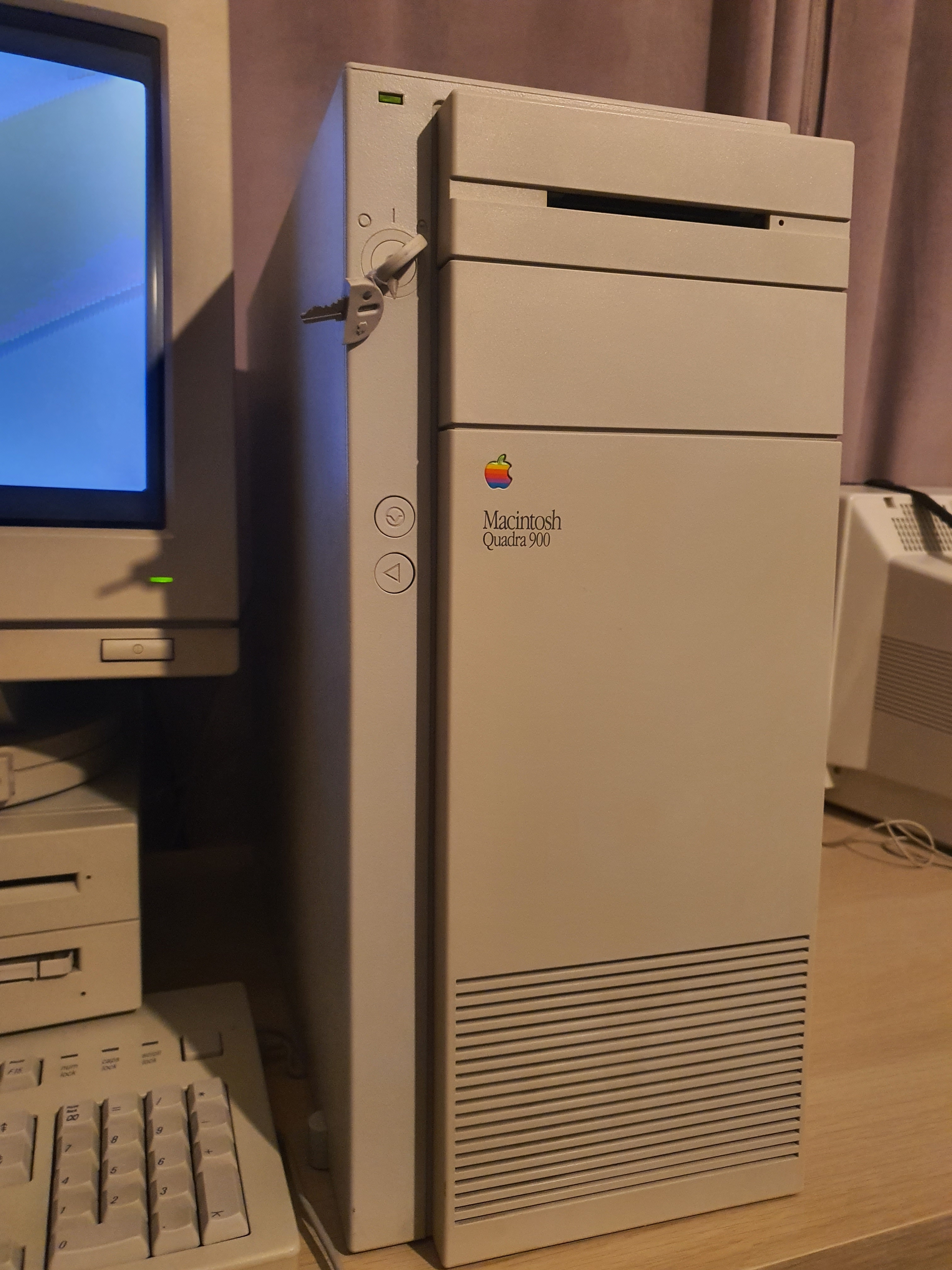
- Developer: Apple Computer
- Product family: Macintosh Quadra
- Released: October 21, 1991
- Introductory price: US$7,200 (equivalent to $17,020 in 2025)
- Discontinued: May 18, 1992
- Operating system: System 7.0.1 – Mac OS 8.1; A/UX 3.0 – 3.1.1
- CPU: Motorola 68040 @ 25 MHz
- Memory: 4 MB, expandable to 256 MB (80 ns 30-pin SIMM)
- Dimensions: Height: 18.6 in (47.25 cm); Width: 8.9 in (22.6 cm); Depth: 20.6 in (52.32 cm)
- Weight: 36.8 pounds (16.7 kg)
- Predecessor: Macintosh IIfx
- Successor: Macintosh Quadra 950
- Related: Macintosh Quadra 700

The Macintosh Quadra 900 is a personal computer designed, manufactured, and sold by Apple Computer from October 1991 to May 1992. It was introduced alongside the Quadra 700 as the first computers in the Quadra family of Macintosh computers using the Motorola 68040 processor. It is also the first computer from Apple to be housed in an 18.6 inch (47 cm) tall mid-tower form factor, which by 1991 had gained momentum with PC manufacturers as a suitable design for departmental servers.

The Quadra 900 had a short lifespan; it was discontinued about six months after the first shipments in favor of the very similar Quadra 950; the 950 has a 33 MHz 68040 and improved graphics support.

== Hardware ==
The Quadra 900 was more expandable than the Quadra 700 but cost US$7,200. The Quadra 900 could be upgraded to 256 megabytes of RAM, an astronomical amount for the time, when a typical midrange system would come equipped with 2–4 MB. The standard, as-shipped configuration for the 900 was 4 MB. The high RAM and storage capacity, along with the expandability of five NuBus 90 slots and fast 25 MHz processor, made it a very useful computer for scientific or design work. The mid-tower case design features a single 5.25-inch drive bay initially intended to hold a tape backup drive, but was often repurposed to hold a CD-ROM or SyQuest drive during the model's operational lifespan. Featuring 16 slots for 30-pin SIMMs (installed in groups of four), Quadra 900s with full complements of RAM were exceedingly rare due to the high cost (many thousands of dollars) of the SIMMs at the time.

A new three-mode key-lock system on the front panel can be set to Off, On, and Secure. When set to Off, the machine can't be powered up. In Secure mode, the floppy drive and ADB port are disabled, offering a degree of local protection.

System 7.0.1 was included and supports up to Mac OS 8.1. Along with the Quadra 700, this is the earliest Macintosh model to support Mac OS 8.

Apple did sell a Quadra 950 logic board upgrade for US$1899, and a Workgroup Server 95 upgrade for $2499. With the Power Macintosh Upgrade Card installed, the Quadra 900 runs at 50 MHz and its name is reported in the System Profiler as the Power Macintosh 900.

== Specifications ==
- Processor: 25 MHz Motorola 68040
- Processor Cache: 8 KB Level 1
- Bus Speed: 25 MHz
- Hard Drive: 160 or 400 MB
- Media drives: 1.44 MB floppy drive with one 5.25" SCSI drive bay available
- Software: Mac OS 7.0.1 - 8.1
- Logicboard RAM: None
- Maximum RAM: 256 MB
- Type of RAM: 30-pin SIMM (16 slots)
- Minimum RAM Speed: 80 ns
- Interleaving Support: No
- Graphics: Integrated
- Display Connection: DB-15
- Graphics Memory: 1 MB standard, upgradable to 2 MB via 4 VRAM slots
- Expansion Slots: 5 - NuBus, 1 - PDS
- Hard Drive Bus: SCSI
- Backup Battery: 3.6 V Lithium
- Max Watts: 303 W
- Ports: AAUI-15 Ethernet, 1 ADB, DB-25 SCSI, 2 Serial, 3.5-mm mono input jack, 3.5-mm stereo output jack

== Timeline ==
Timeline of Macintosh Centris, LC, Performa, and Quadra models, colored by CPU type

See also: List of Mac models
