= Macintosh Quadra 700 =

Personal computer by Apple Computer

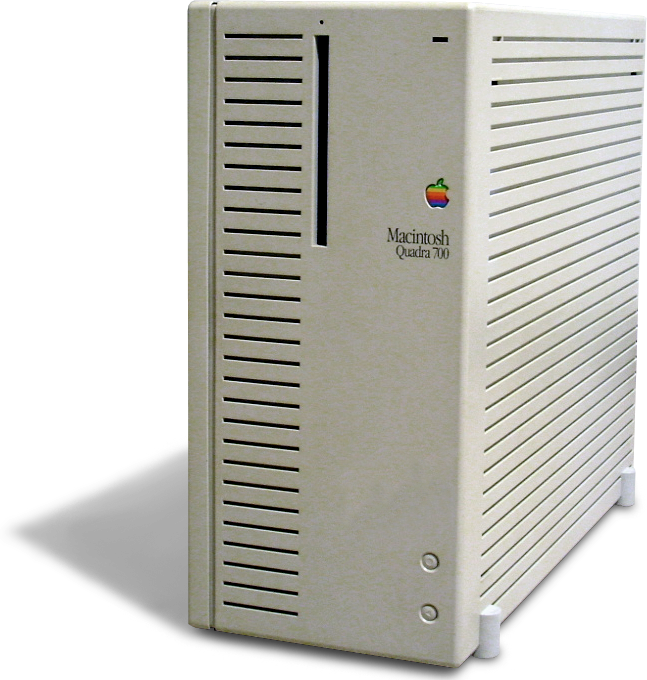
- A Macintosh Quadra 700
- Also known as: "Shadow", "IIce"
- Developer: Apple Computer
- Product family: Macintosh Quadra
- Released: October 21, 1991
- Introductory price: US$5,700 (equivalent to $13,474 in 2025)
- Discontinued: March 15, 1993
- Operating system: System 7.0.1 – Mac OS 8.1; A/UX 3.0 – 3.1.1
- CPU: Motorola 68040 @ 25 MHz
- Memory: 4 MB, expandable to 68 MB (80 ns 30-pin SIMM)
- Dimensions: Height: 5.5 inches (14 cm); Width: 11.9 inches (30 cm); Depth: 14.4 inches (37 cm)
- Weight: 13.6 pounds (6.2 kg)
- Predecessor: Macintosh IIci
- Successor: Macintosh Centris 650; Macintosh Quadra 800
- Related: Macintosh Quadra 900

The Macintosh Quadra 700 is a personal computer designed, manufactured and sold by Apple Computer from October 1991 to March 1993. It was introduced alongside the Quadra 900 as the first computers in the Quadra series, using the Motorola 68040 processor in order to compete with IBM-compatible PCs powered by the Intel i486DX. The Quadra 700 is also the first computer from Apple to be housed in a mini-tower form factor, which in 1991 was becoming a popular alternative to standard monitor-on-desktop cases that were common through the 1980s.

The Quadra 700 was considerably more popular than the Quadra 900 (succeeded after six months by the faster but otherwise very similar Quadra 950) that it was sold alongside, due to the 900/950 having more expansion options in their full tower cases which made them more expensive and bulky. The Quadra 700 originally had a list price of US$5,700, but had dropped to under $4,700 for a base model by the time its replacement, the Quadra 800, went on sale in early 1993, with the 800's mid-tower providing more expansion options and a faster Motorola 68040 clocked at 33 MHz. Also introduced around the same time, the Centris 650 (the more expensive configuration with Ethernet and a full Motorola 68040 at 25 MHz) offered similar performance to the Quadra 700 but in a desktop-style case; the Centris 650 also had an entry-level configuration (featuring a FPU-less Motorola 68LC040 CPU and no Ethernet) with a price point closer to $3,000. Both the Quadra 800 and Centris 650 (later renamed Quadra 650) addressed the Quadra 700's expansion limitations, providing additional drive bays (to accommodate a CD-ROM or extra hard disk) and more NuBus slots.

== Hardware ==
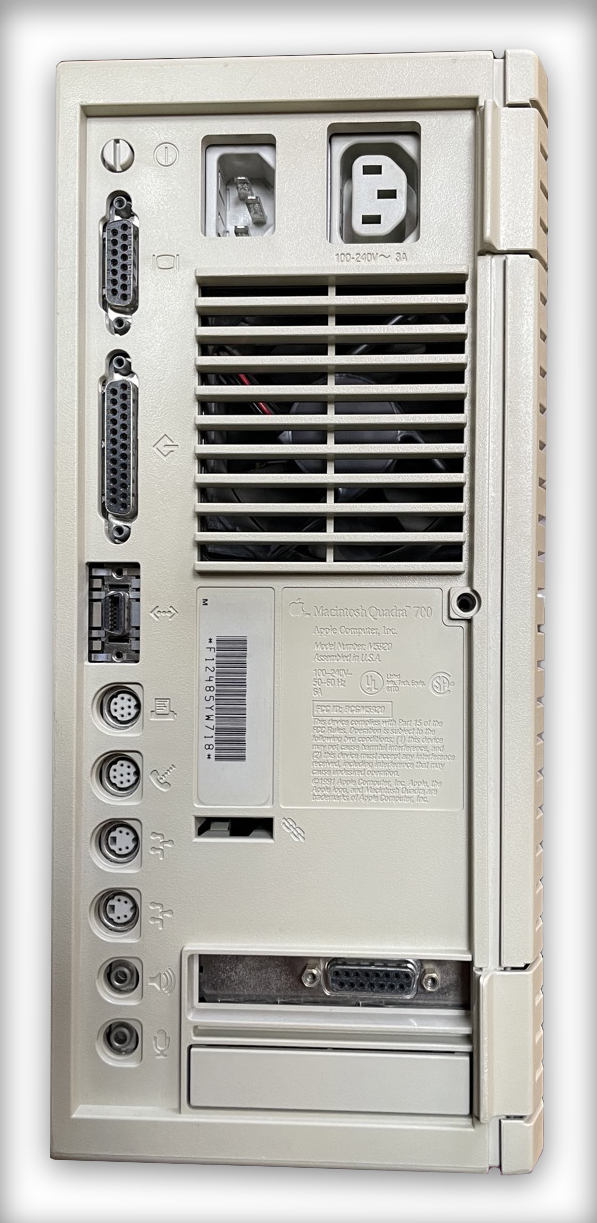
Rear view of a Quadra 700

Form factor: The Quadra 700 case has the same dimensions as the popular Macintosh IIcx and Macintosh IIci models; this made it possible for users of those models to upgrade to the more powerful Quadra 700. The IIcx and IIci were designed to allow their rubber feet to be moved to the side for vertical orientation which was preferred by some users, so the 700 recognized this by making cosmetic changes to the front bezel to emphasize the vertical orientation, including the cooling slate and printing of the Apple logo and model name. Brian Benchoff of Hackaday suggested that the popularity of the Quadra 700 was the turning point for computer manufacturers to move over to the tower form factor en masse. The tower form factor of the Quadra 700 was by necessity: common peripherals of the Quadra were the relatively extremely heavy color CRT monitors offered by Apple (those whose screens measured 20 inches and over diagonally could weigh 80 lbs or more) favored by the desktop publishing industry during the 1990s. Such monitors threatened to crush the plastic frames of the Macintosh IIcx and Macintosh IIci; customers might have been tempted to fit such heavy monitors atop the IIcx and IIci because of their horizontal form factor.

CPU: Motorola 68040 @ 25 MHz. The clock oscillator runs at 50 MHz; replacing it with a faster oscillator (up to 74 MHz) results in a performance increase.

Memory: 4 MB onboard, expandable to 68 MB via four 30-pin SIMM slots.

Expansion: Two NuBus slots and a Processor Direct Slot; processor upgrades from Apple and other manufacturers were sold for the 700 when the PowerPC 601 accelerator cards came along in 1994. However, using a processor direct slot will block one of the NuBus slots.

Storage: 80 and 160 MB hard disks were available at launch. A faster 230 MB unit became available in mid-1992 when the Quadra 950 was introduced. New to the Quadra, Apple began using the 53C96 SCSI Controller, which increased data transfer rates to 4MB/sec.

Video: Like the IIci, the 700 has integrated graphics built into the system board but, unlike the earlier model, it uses dedicated VRAM for its video memory. The onboard video came with 512 kilobytes of VRAM soldered to the motherboard, and supported resolutions up to 1152x870. The video memory was expandable to 2 megabytes via six 256-kilobyte 100ns VRAM SIMMs in each of the VRAM SIMM expansion slots on the motherboard. Expanding the video memory to 2 megabytes allowed for 24-bit (Millions) color at resolutions up to 832x624, a feature shared only with the Quadra 900/950 and Quadra 840AV. 24-bit color support was removed from newer Quadra and Centris models as a cost-saving measure, regardless of how much VRAM is installed, although for the Quadra 800 adding a 24-bit video card enables 24-bit color mode.

Sound: 8-bit stereo, 22 kHz.

Ports: I/O was available with dual serial ports, two ADB ports, an AAUI Ethernet port, mono audio in, stereo audio out, and a DB-25 SCSI connector. The Quadra 700, along with the 900, are the first Macintosh models with built-in support for Ethernet networking.

Operating system: System 7.0.1 was included as standard. Along with the Quadra 900, this is the earliest Macintosh model to support Mac OS 8. The Quadra 700 can also run A/UX.

The Quadra 700 uses tantalum capacitors on the logic board, rather than electrolytic capacitors which can leak fluid.

== In popular culture ==
- The Quadra 700, alongside an SGI Crimson running IRIX, was featured in the film Jurassic Park (1993).
- The original version of the game Myst, for the Macintosh, was created mostly on the Quadra 700 using HyperCard.

== Timeline ==
Timeline of Macintosh Centris, LC, Performa, and Quadra models, colored by CPU type

See also: List of Mac models
