= Macintosh Quadra 650 =

Personal computer by Apple Computer

Centris 650 / Quadra 650
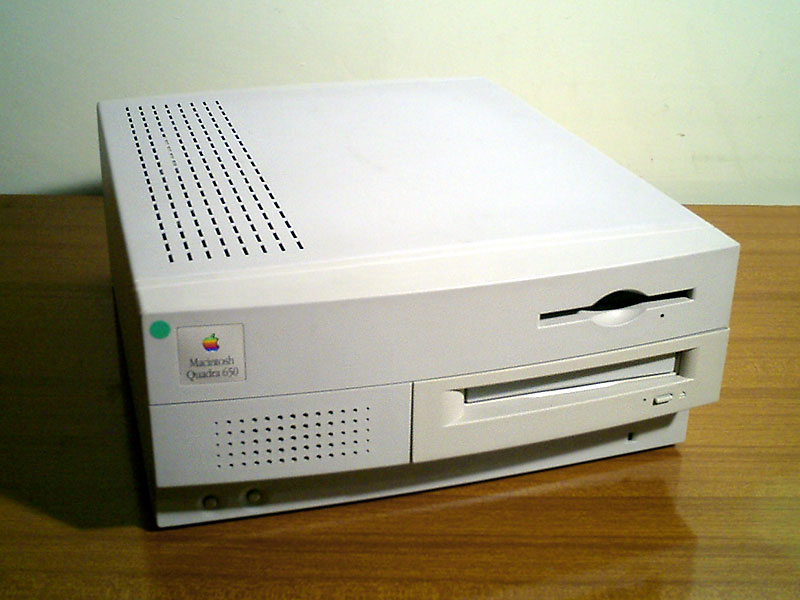
- Developer: Apple Computer
- Product family: Centris, Quadra
- Released: February 10, 1993
- Introductory price: US$2,699 (equivalent to $6,015 in 2025)
- Discontinued: September 12, 1994
- Operating system: System 7.1 – Mac OS 8.1; A/UX 3.0.1 – 3.1.1
- CPU: Motorola 68LC040 or 68040 @ 25 or 33 MHz
- Memory: 4 or 8 MB onboard, expandable to 132 or 136 MB (80 ns 72-pin SIMM)
- Dimensions: Height: 6 inches (15 cm); Width: 13 inches (33 cm); Depth: 16.5 inches (42 cm)
- Weight: 25 pounds (11 kg)
- Predecessor: Macintosh IIci; Macintosh Quadra 700
- Successor: Power Macintosh 7100; Power Macintosh 8100
- Related: Macintosh Quadra 610

The Macintosh Quadra 650, originally sold as the Macintosh Centris 650, is a personal computer designed, manufactured and sold by Apple Computer from February 1993 to September 1994. The Centris 650 was introduced alongside the smaller Centris 610 as the replacement for the Macintosh IIci and Quadra 700, and it was intended as the start of the new midrange Centris line of computers. Later in 1993, Apple decided to follow an emerging industry trend of naming product families for their target customers – Quadra for business, LC for education, and Performa for home – and folded the Centris 650 into the Quadra family. The renamed Quadra 650 also received a speed bump from 25 MHz to 33 MHz for its 68040 CPU.

The Quadra 650 was discontinued without a direct replacement in September 1994, although the recently introduced Power Macintosh 7100, which has the same IIvx desktop case as the Quadra 650, had a similar target audience and was sold in the same price range.

== Models ==
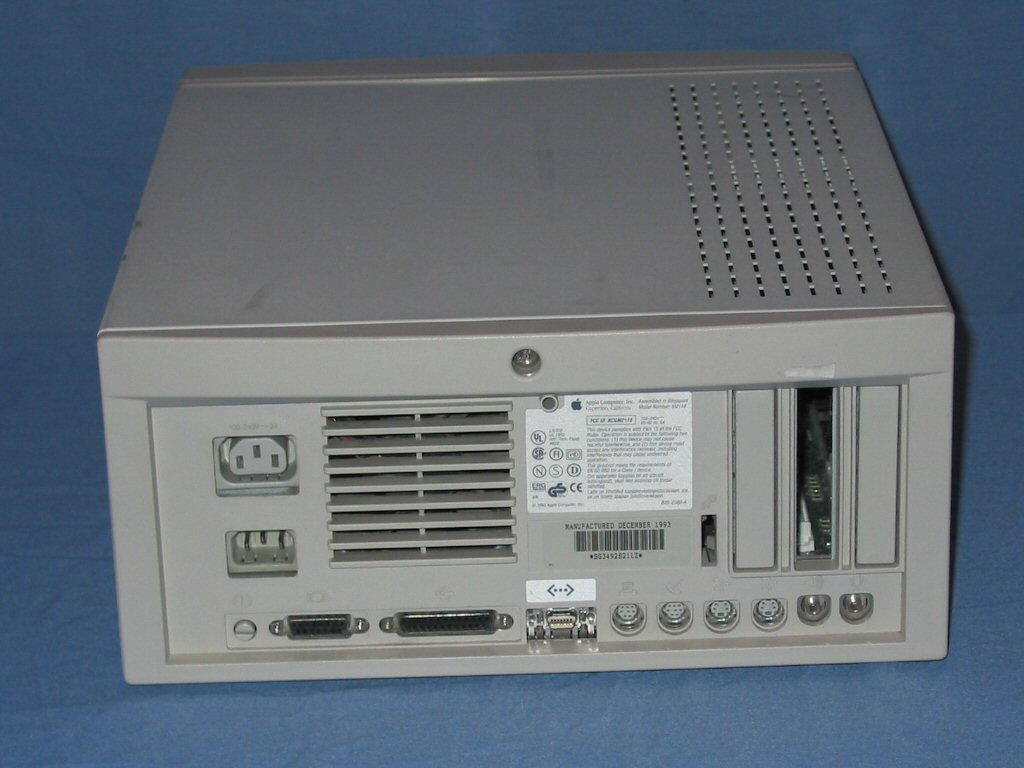
Rear view of a Macintosh Quadra 650

There are two versions of the Centris 650: One with 4 MB of RAM soldered to the logic board and an FPU-less Motorola 68LC040 CPU, and one with 8 MB of logic board RAM, a full Motorola 68040, and an onboard AAUI port for Ethernet. Each can be configured with an 80 MB, 230 MB, or 500 MB 3.5-inch hard drive. Standard equipment on all Centris 650 models includes onboard video (with VGA support via an adapter), 3 NuBus slots, a Processor Direct Slot, two ADB and two serial ports, an external SCSI connector, and a 5.25-inch drive bay. There are four SIMM slots that support 4, 8, 16, and 32 MB SIMMs, allowing for a maximum of 132 or 136 MB of RAM depending on the amount of soldered memory. System 7.1 was included as standard and is the minimum required version.

The higher-end model also came with 1MB VRAM installed, enabling 16-bit color at 640x480 resolution. The availability of 16-bit color was significant, as it was the standard bit depth of Apple's then-new QuickTime video standard. Compared to the Quadra 700, Quadra 900/950 and Quadra 840AV, the Centris/Quadra 650 cannot be expanded to 2MB VRAM and thus does not support 24-bit color unless a 24-bit video card is installed.

As a way to promote the use of multimedia, Apple also sold a Centris 650 "CD-ROM bundle", which had 8 MB of RAM and 1 MB of video RAM, and included a microphone, an AppleCD 300i CD-ROM drive, and a System 7 install CD.

Introduced February 10, 1993:

- Macintosh Centris 650: Sold in five configurations:
  - 25 MHz 68LC040, 4 MB RAM (on board), 512 KB VRAM, 80 MB HDD, no Ethernet
  - 25 MHz 68040, 8 MB RAM (on board), 512 KB VRAM, 80 MB HDD, Ethernet
  - 25 MHz 68040, 8 MB RAM (on board), 512 KB VRAM, 230 MB HDD, Ethernet
  - 25 MHz 68040, 8 MB RAM (on board), 1 MB VRAM, 230 MB HDD, Ethernet, AppleCD 300i and microphone
  - 25 MHz 68040, 24 MB RAM (including 8 MB on board), 1 MB VRAM, 500 MB HDD, Ethernet

Introduced October 21, 1993:

- Macintosh Quadra 650: 33 MHz 68040.

The Quadra 650 performed faster than the Quadra 630 and Quadra 950 but slower than the Quadra 800, despite all four models sharing the 33 MHz 68040.

As the Macintosh IIvx shares the same desktop form factor, it can be upgraded to the Centris/Quadra 650 by swapping the logic board.

== Timeline ==
Timeline of Macintosh Centris, LC, Performa, and Quadra models, colored by CPU type

See also: List of Mac models
