= Macintosh Centris =

Line of computers by Apple, Inc

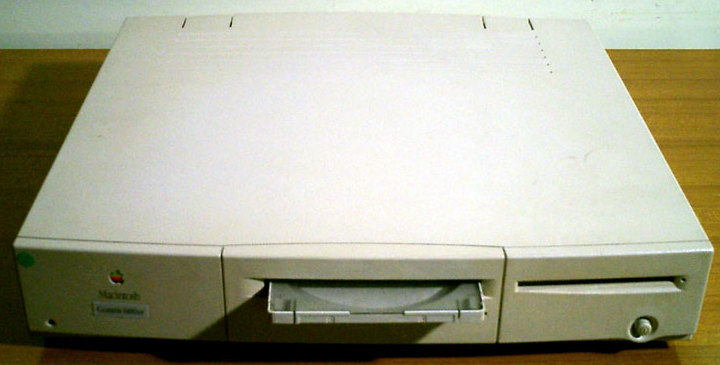
The Macintosh Centris 660AV, the last computer to use the Centris name

Macintosh Centris is a family of personal computers designed, manufactured and sold by Apple Computer, Inc. from 1992 to 1993. They were introduced as a replacement for the six-year-old Macintosh II family of computers; the name was chosen to indicate that the consumer was selecting a Macintosh in the center of Apple's product line. Centris machines were the first to offer Motorola 68040 CPUs at a price point around US$2,500, making them less expensive (albeit slower and less expansion options) than Quadra computers, but also offering considerably higher performance than the Macintosh LC computers of the time powered by the Motorola 68030.

Apple released three computers bearing the Centris name: the Centris 610 (replacing the Macintosh IIsi) and Centris 650 (replacing the Macintosh IIci in form and the Quadra 700 in function), both of which were introduced in March 1993, and the multimedia-focused Centris 660AV which followed in July. Apple also planned for the Macintosh IIvx (although powered by the Motorola 68030) to be part of the Centris line, being released in October 1992, although Apple's lawyers were unable to complete the trademark check on the "Centris" name in time for the IIvx's release.

The retirement of the Centris name was announced in September 1993, with the 610, 650 and 660AV all being rebranded the following month as Macintosh Quadra machines as part of Apple's effort to reposition their product families to correlate with customer markets instead of price ranges and features. The IIvx was also discontinued in favor of the newly announced Quadra 605.

== Overview ==
When the Centris family was released, they offered considerably higher performance than the available members of the Macintosh LC that were built around aging Motorola 68030 CPUs. To fit below the top-of-the-line Quadra family, consisting of the Quadra 800 and Quadra 950 each with 33 MHz 68040 CPUs (with the Quadra 700 soon to be discontinued) and later joined by the Quadra 840AV with its 40 MHz 68040), the Centris models had slower 20 MHz or 25 MHz 68040 CPUs (often the 68LC040 which omits the FPU), slower system buses, and lower RAM and VRAM ceilings.

The Centris 610 uses a 20 MHz 68LC040 CPU, which has no math coprocessor functions. It used a new "pizza box" case that was intended to be placed under the user's computer monitor. The Centris 610 also provided the basis for the Workgroup Server 60. This case was also used for the Power Macintosh 6100 lines of computers and, when these later computers were introduced, Apple offered consumers a product upgrade path by letting them buy a new motherboard. Apple's motherboard upgrades of this type were considered expensive, however, and were not a popular option.

The base-configuration Centris 650 uses a 25 MHz 68LC040 lacking the FPU; while more expensive configurations with built-in Ethernet use the 25 MHz 68040 giving it similar performance to the recently discontinued Quadra 700. The Centris 650 uses the Macintosh IIvx-style desktop case which provides more expansion options than the Quadra 700 (limited by its Macintosh IIci-style mini-tower case).

The Centris 660AV uses a 25 MHz 68040 and also includes a 55 MHz AT&T 3210 digital signal processor, compared to the faster Quadra 840AV powered by a 40 MHz 68040 and 66.7 MHz AT&T 3210 DSP. Like other "AV" computers from Apple, the 660AV supports both video input and output. It uses the "pizza box" case which debuted earlier in the Centris 610.

The Centris 610 and 650 were replaced about six months after their introduction by the Quadra 610 and 650 models, which kept the same case and designs but raised the CPU speeds from 20 MHz and 25 MHz to 25 MHz and 33 MHz, respectively – while the Centris 660AV was renamed as the Quadra 660AV without any actual design change. These Macs also existed during Apple's transition from auto-inject floppy drives to manual-inject drives. This is why there are two different styles of floppy drive bezel (faceplate) on these models. Some later Centris 660AV Macs have manual-inject floppy drives, so this change was not entirely concurrent with the name change.

== Timeline ==
Timeline of Macintosh Centris, LC, Performa, and Quadra models, colored by CPU type

See also: List of Mac models
