= List of Mac models grouped by CPU type =

This list of Mac models grouped by CPU type contains all central processing units (CPUs) used by Apple for their Mac computers. It is grouped by processor family, processor model, and then chronologically by Mac models.

== Motorola 68k ==
=== Motorola 68000 ===
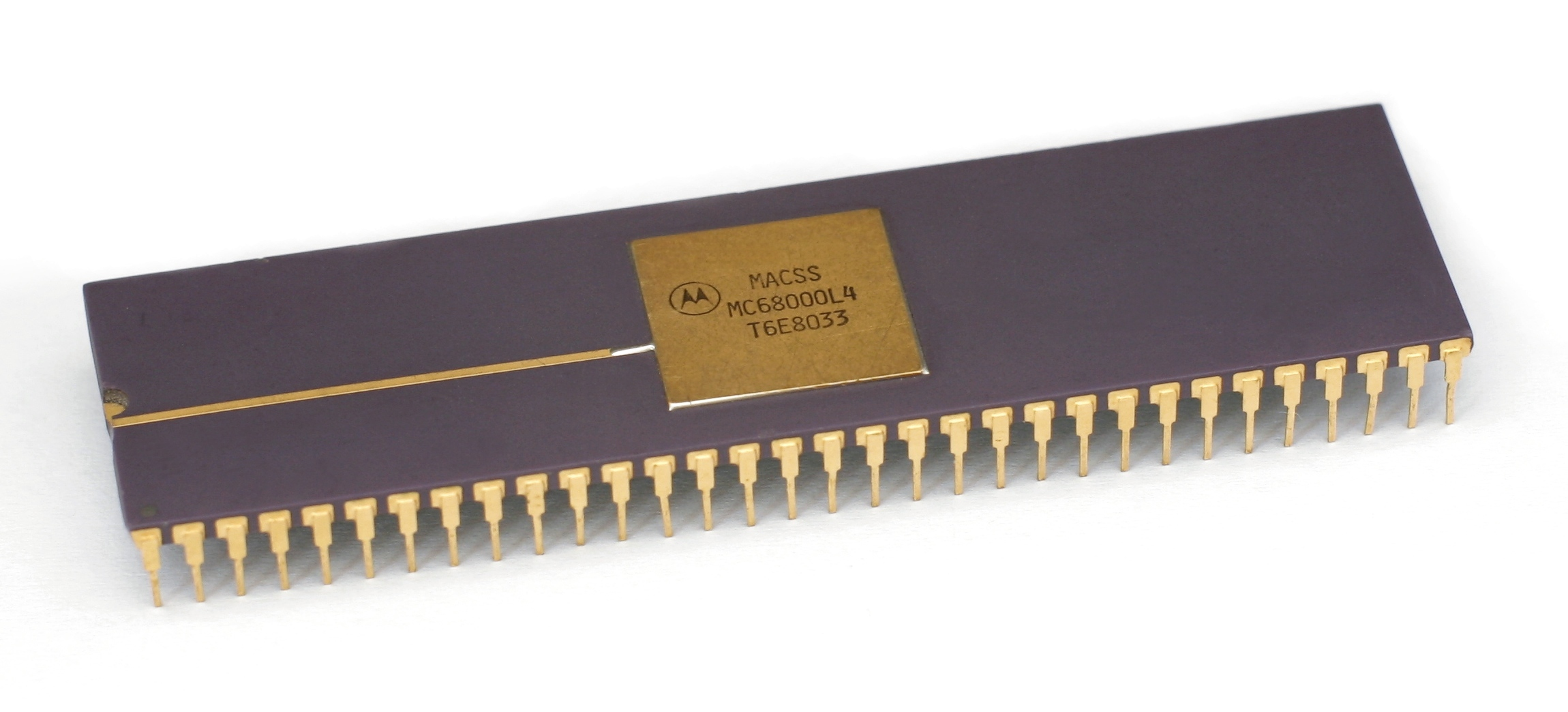
A Motorola 68000 processor in a dual in-line package, as the early Macintosh models used

The Motorola 68000 was the first Apple Macintosh processor. It has 32-bit CPU registers, a 24-bit address bus, and a 16-bit data path; Motorola referred to it as a "16-/32-bit microprocessor."

Processor	Model	Clock speed (MHz)	FSB speed (MT/s)	Introduced	Discontinued
68000	Lisa (Note: Included due to its compatibility with Macintosh software and common use as an early Macintosh development platform.)	5		January 1983	January 1984
68000	Lisa 2	5		January 1984	January 1985
68000	Macintosh (Note: Retroactively named the "Macintosh 128K" after the release of the Macintosh 512K.)	8		January 1984	October 1985
68000	Macintosh 512K	8		September 1984	April 1986
68000	Macintosh XL (Note: An Apple Lisa modified with MacWorks XL to run Mac software.)	5		January 1985	April 1985
68000	Macintosh Plus (Note: Sold in educational markets as the "Macintosh Plus ED.")	8		January 1986	October 1990
68000	Macintosh 512Ke (Note: Sold in educational markets as the "Macintosh ED.")	8		April 1986	September 1987
68000	Macintosh SE	8		March 1987	August 1989
68000	Macintosh SE FDHD	8		August 1989	October 1990
68000	Macintosh Classic	8		October 1990	September 1992
68HC000	Macintosh Portable	16		September 1989	October 1991
68HC000	PowerBook 100	16		October 1991	August 1992

=== Motorola 68020 ===
The Motorola 68020 was the first 32-bit Mac processor, first used on the Macintosh II. The 68020 has many improvements over the 68000, including an instruction cache, and was the first Mac processor to support a paged memory management unit, the Motorola 68851.

The Macintosh LC configured the 68020 to use a 16-bit system bus with ASICs that limited RAM to 10 MB (as opposed to the 32-bit limit of 4 GB).

Processor	Model	Clock speed (MHz)	FSB speed (MT/s)	L1 cache (bytes)	Data path width/ Address width (bits)	PMMU	FPU	Introduced	Discontinued
68020	Macintosh II	16		256	32/16	68851 (optional)	68881	March 1987	January 1990
68020	Macintosh LC	16		256	16/16	—N/a		October 1990	March 1992

=== Motorola 68030 ===
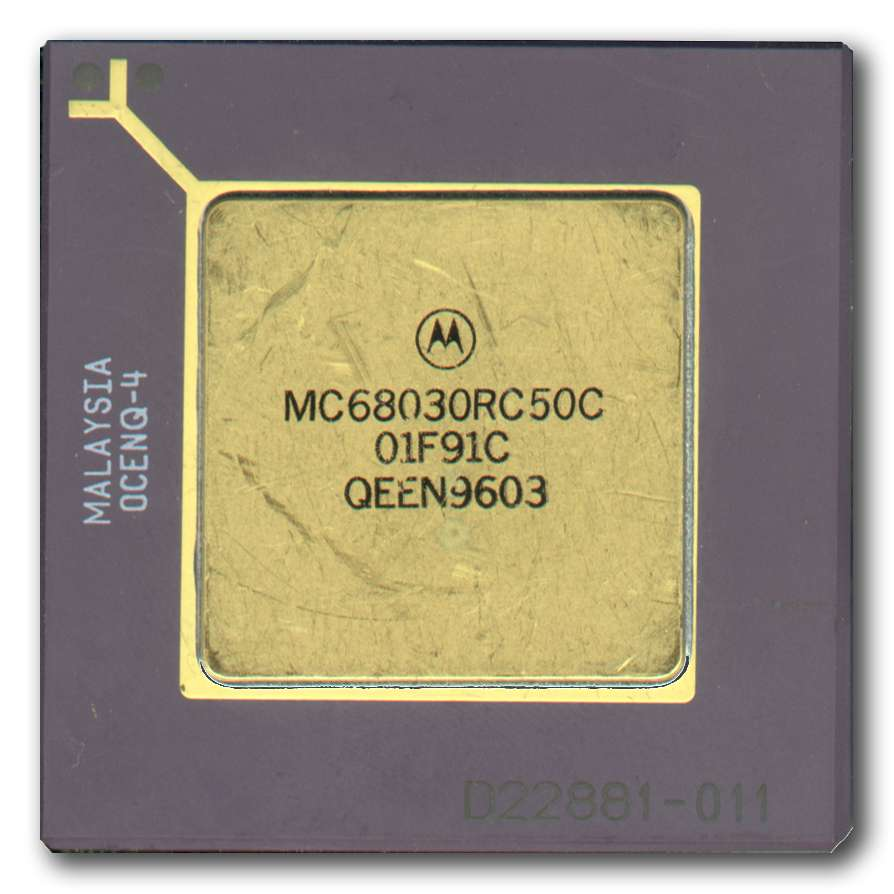
A Motorola 68030 processor

The Motorola 68030 was the first Mac processor with an integrated paged memory management unit, allowing for virtual memory. Another improvement over the 68020 was the addition of a data cache.

Processor	Model	Clock speed (MHz)	FSB speed (MT/s)	L1 cache (bytes)	L2 cache (KB)	Data path width/ Address width (bits)	FPU	Introduced	Discontinued
68030	Macintosh IIx	16		512	—N/a	32/32	68882	September 1988	October 1990
68030	Macintosh SE/30	16		512	—N/a	32/32	68882	January 1989	October 1990
68030	Macintosh IIcx	16		512	—N/a	32/32	68882	March 1989	February 1991
68030	Macintosh IIci	25		512	0–32	32/32	68882	September 1989	February 1993
68030	Macintosh IIfx	40		512	32	32/32	68882	March 1990	April 1992
68030	Macintosh IIsi	20		512	—N/a	32/32	68882 (optional)	October 1990	March 1993
68030	Macintosh Classic II; Performa 200	16		512	—N/a	16/32	—N/a	October 1991	September 1993
68030	PowerBook 140	16		512	—N/a	32/32	—N/a	October 1991	August 1992
68030	PowerBook 170	25		512	—N/a	32/32	68882	October 1991	October 1992
68030	Macintosh LC II; Performa 400; Performa 405; Performa 410; Performa 430	16		512	—N/a	16/32	—N/a	March 1992	March 1993
68030	PowerBook 145	25		512	—N/a	32/32	—N/a	August 1992	June 1993
68030	Performa 600/600CD	32	16	512	32	32/32	68882 (optional)	September 1992	October 1993
68030	Macintosh IIvi	16		512	32	32/32	68882 (optional)	October 1992	February 1993
68030	Macintosh IIvx	32	16	512	32	32/32	68882	October 1992	October 1993
68030	PowerBook 160	25		512	—N/a	32/32	—N/a	October 1992	August 1993
68030	PowerBook 180	33		512	—N/a	32/32	68882	October 1992	May 1994
68030	PowerBook Duo 210	25		512	—N/a	32/32	—N/a	October 1992	October 1993
68030	PowerBook Duo 230	33		512	—N/a	32/32	—N/a	October 1992	July 1994
68030	Macintosh Color Classic; Performa 250; Performa 275	16		512	—N/a	16/32	68882 (optional)	February 1993	May 1994
68030	Macintosh LC III; Performa 450	25		512	—N/a	32/32	68882 (optional)	February 1993	February 1994
68030	PowerBook 165c	33		512	—N/a	32/32	68882	February 1993	December 1993
68030	Macintosh LC 520	25		512	—N/a	32/32	68882 (optional)	June 1993	February 1994
68030	PowerBook 180c	33		512	—N/a	32/32	68882	June 1993	March 1994
68030	PowerBook 145B	25		512	—N/a	32/32	—N/a	July 1993	July 1994
68030	PowerBook 165	33		512	—N/a	32/32	—N/a	August 1993	July 1994
68030	Macintosh LC III+ Performa 460; Performa 466; Performa 467	33		512	—N/a	32/32	68882 (optional)	October 1993	February 1994
68030	Macintosh Color Classic II	33		512	—N/a	32/32	68882 (optional)	October 1993	May 1994
68030	Macintosh TV	32	16	512	—N/a	32/32	—N/a	October 1993	February 1994
68030	PowerBook Duo 250	33		512	—N/a	32/32	—N/a	October 1993	May 1994
68030	PowerBook Duo 270c	33		512	—N/a	32/32	68882	October 1993	April 1994
68030	Macintosh LC 550; Performa 550; Performa 560	33		512	—N/a	32/32	68882 (optional)	February 1994	March 1995
68030	PowerBook 150	33		512	—N/a	32/32	—N/a	July 1994	October 1995

=== Motorola 68040 ===
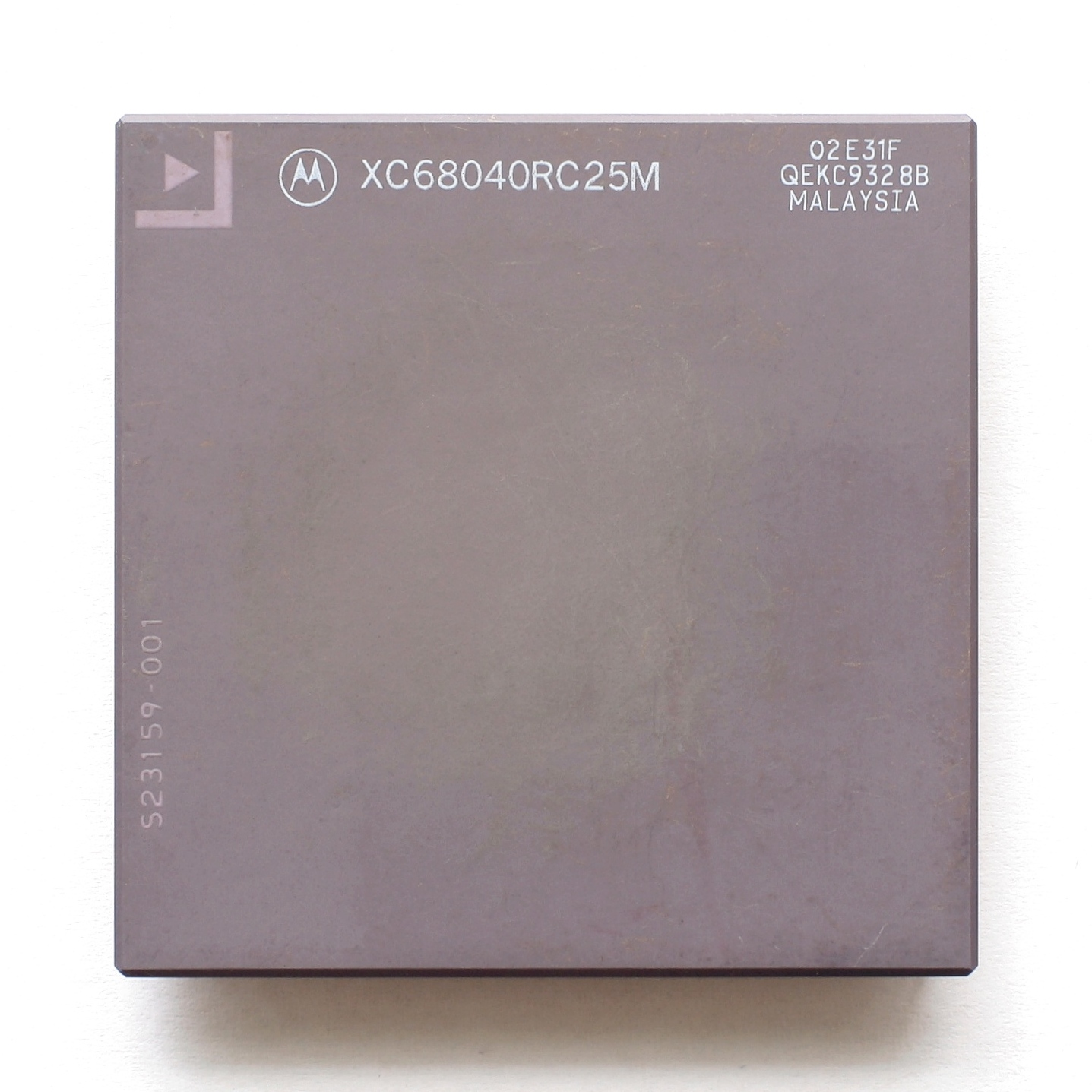
A Motorola 68040 processor

The Motorola 68040 has improved per-clock performance compared to the 68030, as well as larger instruction and data caches, and was the first Mac processor with an integrated floating-point unit.

The MC68LC040 version was less expensive because it omitted the floating-point unit.

Processor	Model	Clock speed (MHz)	FSB speed (MT/s)	L1 cache (KB)	Introduced	Discontinued
68040	Macintosh Quadra 700	25		8	October 1991	March 1993
68040	Macintosh Quadra 900	25		8	October 1991	May 1992
68040	Macintosh Quadra 950	33		8	May 1992	October 1995
68040	Macintosh Centris 650	25		8	February 1993	October 1993
68040	Macintosh Quadra 800; Workgroup Server 80	33		8	February 1993	March 1994
68040	Workgroup Server 95 (Note: Shipped with A/UX operating system but capable of running Mac OS.)	33		8	March 1993	April 1995
68040	Macintosh Centris 660AV; Macintosh Quadra 660AV	25		8	July 1993	September 1994
68040	Macintosh Quadra 840AV	40		8	July 1993	July 1994
68040	Workgroup Server 60	20–25		8	July 1993	October 1994
68040	Macintosh Quadra 610	25		8	October 1993	July 1994
68040	Macintosh Quadra 650	33		8	October 1993	September 1994
68040	Macintosh Quadra 630	33		8	July 1994	October 1995
68040	PowerBook 550c	33		8	May 1995	April 1996
68LC040	Macintosh Centris 610	20		8	February 1993	October 1993
68LC040	Macintosh LC 475; Macintosh Quadra 605; Performa 475; Performa 476	25		8	October 1993	October 1994
68LC040	Macintosh LC 575; Performa 575; Performa 576; Performa 577; Performa 578	33		8	February 1994	April 1995
68LC040	PowerBook Duo 280	33		8	April 1994	November 1994
68LC040	PowerBook Duo 280c	33		8	April 1994	January 1996
68LC040	PowerBook 520	25		8	May 1994	June 1995
68LC040	PowerBook 520c	25		8	May 1994	September 1995
68LC040	PowerBook 540	33		8	May 1994	October 1994
68LC040	PowerBook 540c	33		8	May 1994	August 1995
68LC040	Macintosh LC 630; Performa 630; Performa 630CD; Performa 631CD; Performa 635CD; Performa 636; Performa 636CD; Performa 637CD; Performa 638CD; Performa 640CD	33		8	July 1994	February 1996
68LC040	Macintosh LC 580; Performa 580CD; Performa 588CD	33		8	April 1995	April 1996
68LC040	PowerBook 190	33		8	August 1995	June 1996
68LC040	PowerBook 190cs	33		8	August 1995	October 1996

== PowerPC ==
=== PowerPC 600 series ===
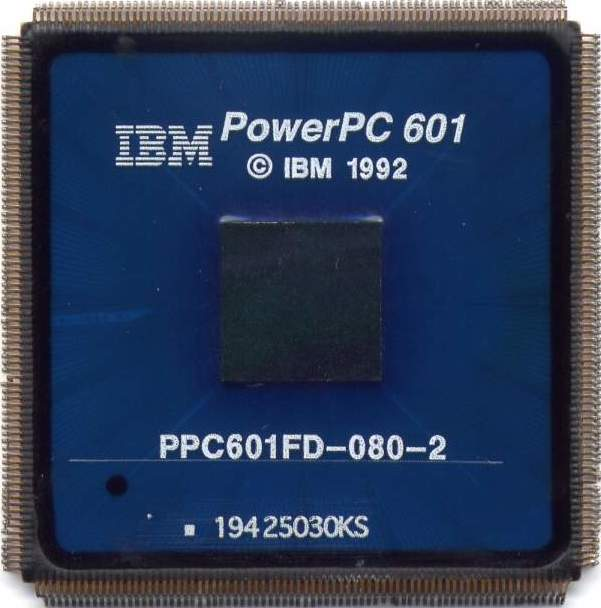
An IBM PowerPC 601 processor

The PowerPC 601 was the first Mac processor to support the 32-bit PowerPC instruction set architecture.

The PowerPC 604e was the first Mac processor available in a symmetric multiprocessing (SMP) configuration.

Processor	Model	Clock speed (MHz)	FSB speed (MT/s)	L1 cache (KB) (data/ instr.)	L2 cache (KB)	Introduced	Discontinued
601	Power Macintosh 6100; Performa 6110CD; Performa 6112CD; Performa 6115CD; Performa 6116CD; Performa 6117CD; Performa 6118CD	60–66	30.0–33.3	16/16	—N/a	March 1994	October 1995
601	Power Macintosh 7100	66–80	33.3–40.0	16/16	—N/a	March 1994	January 1996
601	Power Macintosh 8100	80–100	33.3–40.0	16/16	256	March 1994	July 1995
601	Workgroup Server 6150	60–66	30.0–33.3	16/16	—N/a	April 1994	April 1996
601	Workgroup Server 8150	80–110	36.7–40.0	16/16	256	April 1994	April 1996
601	Workgroup Server 9150	80–120	40.0	16/16	512–1024	April 1994	May 1996
601	Power Macintosh 7200	75–120	37.5–40.0	16/16	—N/a	August 1995	February 1997
601	Power Macintosh 7500	100	50.0	16/16	—N/a	August 1995	May 1996
601	Workgroup Server 7250	120	40.0	16/16	—N/a	February 1996	April 1997
601	Power Macintosh 8200	100–120	40.0	16/16	256	April 1996	July 1996
601v	Power Macintosh 8100	110	36.7	16/16	256	March 1994	July 1995
603	Power Macintosh 5200 LC; Performa 5200CD; Performa 5210CD; Performa 5215CD; Performa 5220CD	75	37.5	8/8	256	April 1995	April 1996
603	Power Macintosh 6200; Performa 6200CD; Performa 6205CD; Performa 6210CD; Performa 6214CD; Performa 6216CD; Performa 6218CD; Performa 6220CD; Performa 6230CD	75	37.5	8/8	256	May 1995	July 1997
603e	Power Macintosh 5300 LC; Performa 5300CD (DE); Performa 5320CD	100–120	40.0	16/16	256	August 1995	April 1996
603e	PowerBook 5300c/ce/cs	100–117	33.3	16/16	—N/a	August 1995	August 1996
603e	PowerBook Duo 2300c	100	33.3	16/16	—N/a	August 1995	February 1997
603e	Power Macintosh 5260; Performa 5260CD; Performa 5270CD; Performa 5280CD	100–120	40.0	16/16	256	April 1996	March 1997
603e	Performa 6260CD; Performa 6290CD; Performa 6300CD; Performa 6310CD	100	40.0	16/16	256	May 1996	July 1997
603e	Power Macintosh 6300/120; Performa 6320	120	40.0	16/16	256	May 1996	July 1997
603e	Power Macintosh 4400; Power Macintosh 7220	160–200	40.0	16/16	256	November 1996	February 1998
603e	PowerBook 1400c/cs	117–133	33.3	16/16	—N/a	November 1996	May 1998
603ev	Power Macintosh 5400; Performa 5400CD; Performa 5410CD; Performa 5420CD; Performa 5430CD; Performa 5440CD	120–200	40.0	16/16	256	April 1996	early 1998
603ev	Power Macintosh 6400; Performa 6400; Performa 6410; Performa 6420	180–200	40.0	16/16	256	August 1996	August 1997
603ev	Performa 6360 (Note: Sold in Europe and Asia as the "Power Macintosh 6300/160.")	160	40.0	16/16	—N/a	October 1996	October 1997
603ev	PowerBook 1400c/cs	166	33.3	16/16	128	November 1996	May 1998
603ev	Power Macintosh 5500	225–275	50.0	16/16	256	February 1997	early 1998
603ev	Power Macintosh 6500	225–300	50.0	16/16	256	February 1997	March 1998
603ev	PowerBook 3400	180–240	40.0	16/16	256	February 1997	November 1997
603ev	20th Anniversary Macintosh	250	50.0	16/16	128	May 1997	March 1998
603ev	PowerBook 2400	180–240	40.0	16/16	256	May 1997	May 1998
604	Power Macintosh 9500	120–150	40–50	512	1	May 1995	August 1996
604	Power Macintosh 8500	120–150	40–50	256	1	August 1995	September 1996
604	Network Server 500 (Note: Shipped with AIX operating system and incapable of running Mac OS.)	132	44	512	1	February 1996	April 1997
604	Workgroup Server 8550	132	44	512	1	February 1996	September 1996
604	Power Macintosh 7600	120–132	40–44	256	1	April 1996	August 1996
604e	Power Macintosh 8500	180	45	256	1	August 1996	February 1997
604e	Power Macintosh 9500	180–200	45–50	512	1–2	August 1996	February 1997
604e	Power Macintosh 7600	200	50	256	1	August 1996	November 1997
604e	Network Server 700	150–200	50	1024	1	September 1996	April 1997
604e	Workgroup Server 8550	200	50	512	1	September 1996	April 1997
604e	Power Macintosh 7300	166–200	45–50	256	1	February 1997	November 1997
604e	Power Macintosh 8600	200	50	512	1	February 1997	August 1997
604e	Power Macintosh 9600	200–233	50	512	1–2	February 1997	August 1997
604e	Workgroup Server 7350	180	45	256	1	April 1997	March 1998
604e	Workgroup Server 9650	233	50	512	1	April 1997	August 1997
604ev	Power Macintosh 8600	250–300	50	1024	1	August 1997	February 1998
604ev	Power Macintosh 9600	300–350	50	1024	1	August 1997	March 1998
604ev	Workgroup Server 9650	350	50	1024	1	August 1997	March 1998

=== PowerPC G3 ===
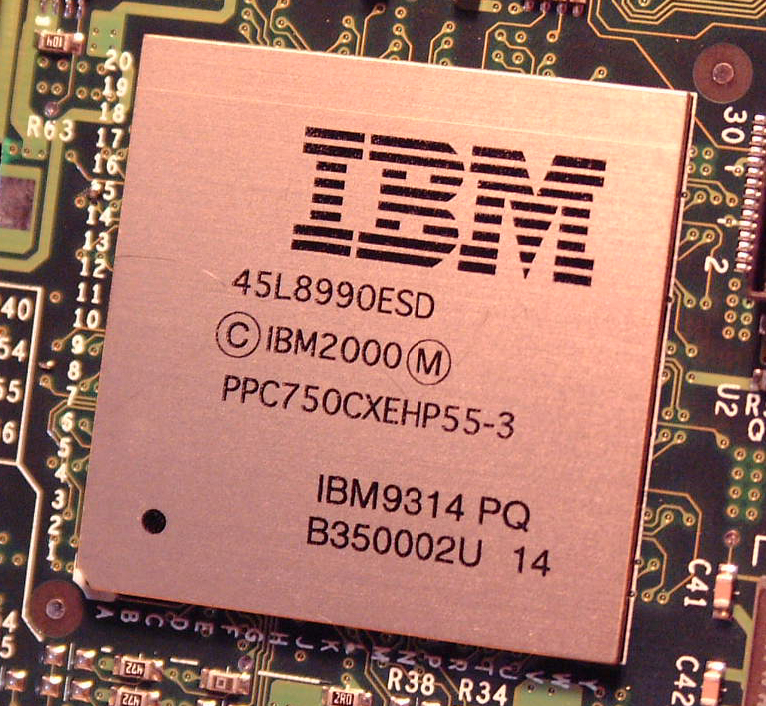
An IBM PowerPC 750CXe ("G3") processor

Processor	Model	Clock speed (MHz)	FSB speed (MT/s)	L2 cache (KB)	Introduced	Discontinued
750	Power Macintosh G3 (Beige)	233–333	66	512–1024	November 1997	January 1999
750	PowerBook G3	233–500	50–100	512–1024	November 1997	January 2001
750	Macintosh Server G3 (Beige)	233–333	66	1024	March 1998	December 1998
750	iMac G3 (original) iMac G3 (Summer 2000) iMac G3 (Winter 2001)	233–500	66–100	512	August 1998	July 2001
750	Power Macintosh G3 (Blue & White)	300–450	100	1024	January 1999	September 1999
750	Macintosh Server G3 (Blue & White)	350–450	100	1024	January 1999	August 1999
750	iBook (original) iBook (original SE)	300–366	66	512	September 1999	September 2000
750CX	iMac G3 (Winter 2001) iMac G3 (Summer 2001)	600	100	256	September 2000	May 2001
750CXe	iBook (FireWire) iBook (FireWire SE) iBook G3 Dual USB ("Snow" Mid 2001) iBook G3 Dual USB ("Snow" Late 2001)	366–500	66–100	256–512	September 2000	May 2002
750CXe	iMac G3 (Summer 2001)	500–700	100	256	July 2001	March 2003
755	iBook G3 Dual USB ("Snow" Late 2001) iBook G3 Dual USB ("Snow" Early 2002)	600	100	256	October 2001	May 2002
750FX	iBook G3 Dual USB ("Snow" Mid 2002) iBook G3 Dual USB ("Snow" Late 2002) iBook G3 Dual USB ("Snow" Early 2003)	600–900	100	512	May 2002	October 2003

=== PowerPC G4 ===
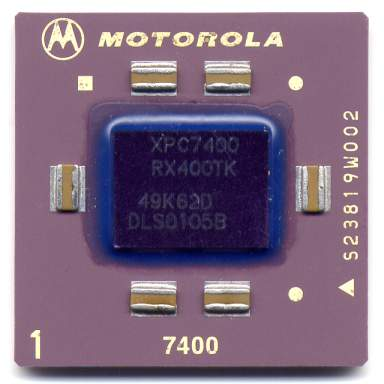
A Motorola PowerPC 7400 ("G4") processor

The PowerPC 7400 was the first Mac processor to include an AltiVec vector processing unit.

The PowerPC 7455 was the first Mac processor over 1 GHz.

Processor	Model	Clock speed (MHz)	FSB speed (MT/s)	L2 cache (KB)	L3 cache (MB)	CPUs	Introduced	Discontinued
7400	Power Mac G4 (Graphite)	350–500	100	512–1024	—N/a	1–2	September 1999	January 2001
7400	Macintosh Server G4 (Graphite)	350–500	100	512–1024	—N/a	1–2	January 2000	January 2001
7400	Power Mac G4 Cube	450–500	100	512–1024	—N/a	1	August 2000	April 2001
7410	Power Mac G4 (Digital Audio)	466–533	133	1024	—N/a	1–2	January 2001	July 2001
7410	PowerBook G4 (Mercury)	400–500	100	1024	—N/a	1	January 2001	October 2001
7410	Macintosh Server G4 (Digital Audio)	466–533	133	1024	—N/a	1–2	January 2001	July 2001
7410	Power Mac G4 Cube (Note: User reports indicate that the Power Mac G4 Cube began shipping with the more power efficient PowerPC 7410 in April 2001.)	450–500	100	1024	—N/a	1	April 2001	July 2001
7441	eMac (2002)	700–800	100	256	—N/a	1	April 2002	May 2003
7445	eMac (2003)	800–1000	133	256	—N/a	1	May 2003	April 2004
7450	Power Mac G4 (Digital Audio); Power Mac G4 (Quicksilver)	667–867	133	256–1024	0–2	1–2	January 2001	January 2002
7450	Macintosh Server G4 (Quicksilver)	733–1000	133	256	0–2	1–2	September 2001	August 2002
7450	PowerBook G4 (Onyx)	550–667	100–133	256	—N/a	1	October 2001	July 2002
7450	iMac G4 (2002)	700–800	100	256	—N/a	1	January 2002	January 2003
7451	PowerBook G4 (Ivory)	667–800	133–167	256	—N/a	1	January 2002	June 2004
7455	Power Mac G4 (Quicksilver)	800–1420	133–167	256	1–4	1–2	January 2002	June 2004
7455	PowerBook G4 (Antimony)	667–1000	133–167	256	0–1	1	April 2002	September 2003
7455	Xserve G4	1000–1333	133	256	2	1–2	May 2002	January 2004
7455	Macintosh Server G4 (Quicksilver)	1000–1250	133–167	256	1–2	1–2	August 2002	January 2003
7455	iMac G4 (2003)	800–1250	100–167	256	—N/a	1	February 2003	July 2004
7457	iBook G4 (Original)	800–1000	133	256	—N/a	1	October 2003	April 2004
7447	PowerBook G4 (Aluminum)	1000–1333	133–167	512	—N/a	1	September 2003	April 2004
7447a	PowerBook G4 (Aluminum)	1333–1667	167	512	—N/a	1	April 2004	April 2006
7447a	iBook G4 (2004, 2005)	1000–1420	133–142	512	—N/a	1	April 2004	May 2006
7447a	Mac mini G4	1250–1500	167	512	—N/a	1	January 2005	February 2006
7447a	eMac (2004)	1250	167	512	—N/a	1	April 2004	May 2005
7447a	eMac (2005)	1420	167	512	—N/a	1	May 2005	July 2006

=== PowerPC G5 ===
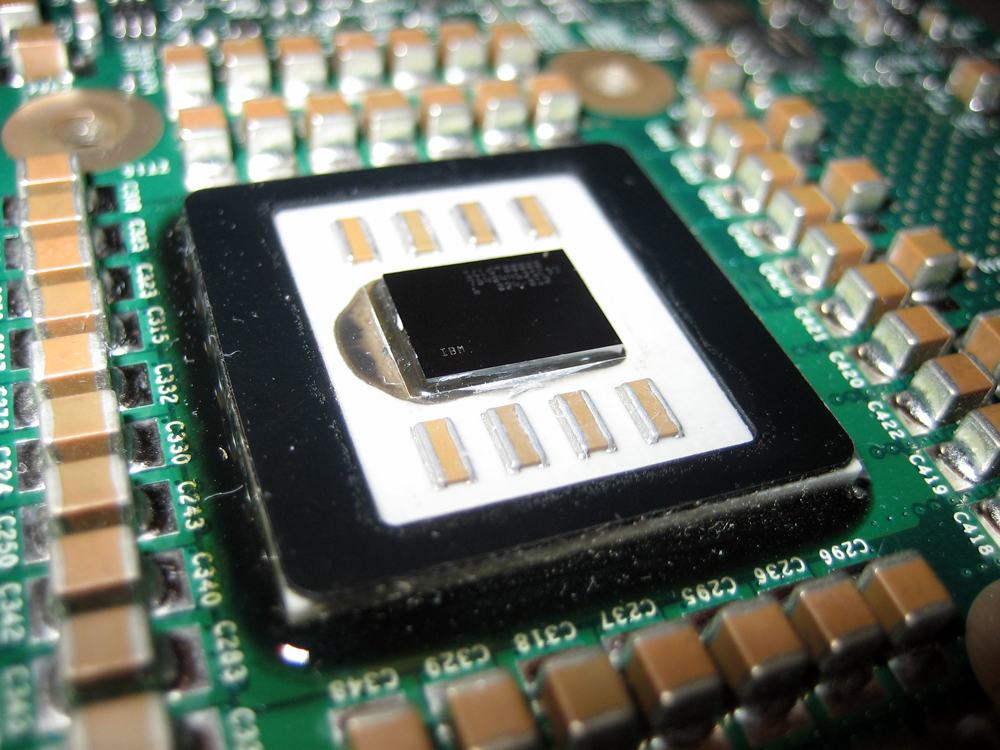
An IBM PowerPC 970FX ("G5") processor

The PowerPC 970 ("G5") was the first 64-bit Mac processor.

The PowerPC 970MP was the first dual-core Mac processor and the first to be found in a quad-core configuration. It was also the first Mac processor with partitioning and virtualization capabilities. Apple only used three variants of the G5 before moving to Intel architecture.

Processor	Model	Clock speed (GHz)	FSB speed (MT/s)	L2 cache (KB)	CPUs	Cores per CPU	Introduced	Discontinued
970	Power Mac G5 (original)	1.6–2.0	800–1000	512	1–2	1	June 2003	June 2004
970FX	Xserve G5	2.0–2.3	1000–1150	512	1–2	1	January 2004	August 2005
970FX	Power Mac G5 (Mid 2004, Early 2005)	1.8–2.7	900–1350	512	1–2	1	June 2004	November 2005
970FX	iMac G5	1.6–2.1	533–700	512	1	1	August 2004	January 2006
970MP	Power Mac G5 (Late 2005)	2.0–2.5	1000–1250	2×1024	1–2	2	November 2005	August 2006

== Intel x86 ==
Sources: Mac Benchmarks - Geekbench Browser and Haslam, Karen, Which Mac processor? Apple processor comparison: M1 vs Intel

=== Overview ===
Processor family	Process (nm)	MMX	SSE	SSE2	SSE3	SSSE3	SSE4.1	SSE4.2	AVX	DBS/ EIST	XD bit	VT-x	AES	Intel 64	Quick Sync	TXT	QPI	HT	ITB
Yonah	65	Yes	Yes	Yes	Yes	No	No	No	No	Yes	Yes	Yes	No	No	No	No	No	No	No
Core Penryn	65/45	Yes	Yes	Yes	Yes	Some	Some	No	No	Yes	Yes	Yes	No	Yes	No	Some	No	No	No
Nehalem Westmere	45/32	Yes	Yes	Yes	Yes	Yes	Yes	Yes	No	Yes	Yes	Yes	Some	Yes	No	Some	Some	Some	Some
Sandy Bridge Ivy Bridge	32/22	Yes	Yes	Yes	Yes	Yes	Yes	Yes	Yes	Yes	Yes	Yes	Some	Yes	Some	Some	Some	Some	Some
Haswell Broadwell	22/14	Yes	Yes	Yes	Yes	Yes	Yes	Yes	Yes	Yes	Yes	Yes	Some	Yes	Some	Some	Some	Some	Some
Skylake Kaby Lake Coffee Lake Cascade Lake Comet Lake Ice Lake	14/10	Yes	Yes	Yes	Yes	Yes	Yes	Yes	Yes	Yes	Yes	Yes	Yes	Yes	Yes	Some	Some	Some	Some

=== P6 ===
Yonah was the first Mac processor to support the IA-32 instruction set architecture, in addition to the MMX, SSE, SSE2, and SSE3 extension instruction sets.

The Core Solo was a Core Duo with one of the two cores disabled.

Processor	Model	Clock speed (GHz)	FSB speed (MT/s)	L2 cache (MB)	CPUs	Cores per CPU	Introduced	Discontinued
Core Duo ("Yonah")	iMac (Early 2006) iMac (Mid 2006)	1.83–2.00	667	2	1	2	January 2006	September 2006
Core Duo ("Yonah")	MacBook Pro (Early 2006)	1.83–2.16	667	2	1	2	February 2006	October 2006
Core Duo ("Yonah")	Mac mini (Early 2006); Mac mini (Late 2006)	1.66–1.83	667	2	1	2	February 2006	August 2007
Core Duo ("Yonah")	MacBook (Mid 2006)	1.83–2.00	667	2	1	2	May 2006	November 2006
Core Solo ("Yonah")	Mac mini (Early 2006)	1.50	667	2	1	1	February 2006	September 2006
Pentium M ULV ("Crofton")	Apple TV (1st generation) (Note: Ran a modified version of Mac OS X with the Front Row user interface.) (Note: Teardowns indicate that it used an under clocked Dothan-based Pentium M ULV processor, called "Crofton" by Intel.)	1.00	350	2	1	1	January 2007	September 2010

=== Core ===
Woodcrest added support for the SSSE3 instruction set.

Merom was the first Mac processor to support the x86-64 instruction set, as well as the first 64-bit processor to appear in a Mac notebook.

Clovertown was the first to be found in an 8-core configuration.

Processor	Model	Clock speed (GHz)	FSB speed (MT/s)	L2 cache (MB)	CPUs	Cores per CPU	Introduced	Discontinued
Xeon 5100 ("Woodcrest")	Mac Pro (Mid 2006)	2.00–3.00	1333	4	2	2	August 2006	January 2008
Xeon 5100 ("Woodcrest")	Xserve (Late 2006)	2.00–3.00	1333	4	2	2	October 2006	January 2008
Core 2 Duo ("Merom")	iMac (Late 2006) iMac (Mid 2007)	1.83–2.40	667–800	2–4	1	2	September 2006	April 2008
Core 2 Duo ("Merom")	MacBook Pro (Late 2006); MacBook Pro (Mid 2007); MacBook Pro (Late 2007)	2.16–2.60	667–800	4	1	2	October 2006	February 2008
Core 2 Duo ("Merom")	MacBook (Late 2006); MacBook (Mid 2007); MacBook (Late 2007)	1.83–2.20	667–800	2–4	1	2	November 2006	February 2008
Core 2 Duo ("Merom")	Mac mini (Mid 2007)	1.83–2.00	667	2–4	1	2	August 2007	March 2009
Core 2 Duo ("Merom")	MacBook Air (Unibody)	1.60–1.80	800	4	1	2	January 2008	October 2008
Xeon 5300 ("Clovertown")	Mac Pro (Mid 2006)	3.00	1333	2×4	2	4	April 2007	January 2008
Core 2 Extreme ("Merom XE")	iMac (Mid 2007)	2.80	800	4	1	2	August 2007	April 2008

=== Penryn ===
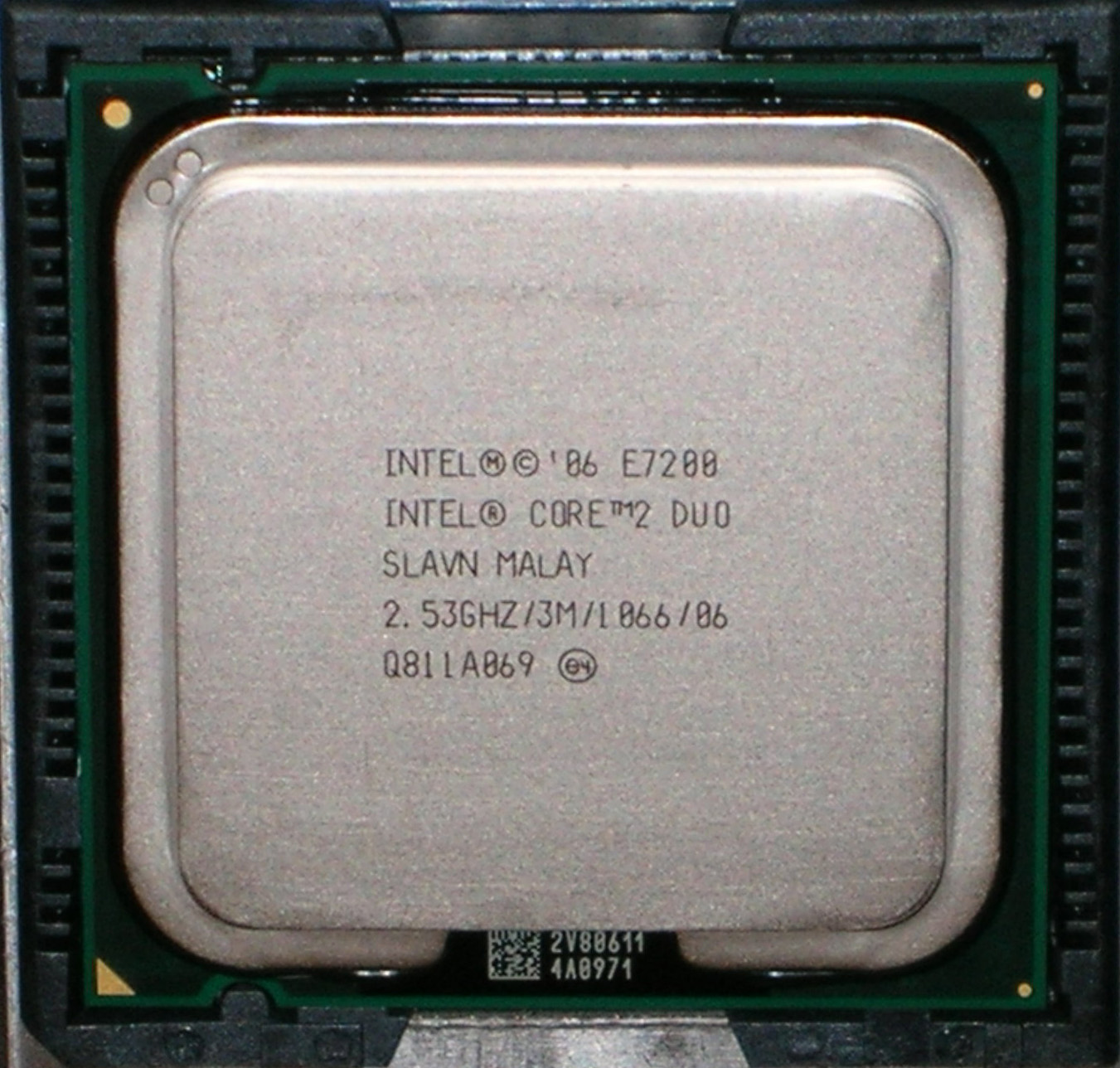
An Intel Wolfdale processor

Penryn added support for a subset for SSE4 (SSE4.1).

Processor	Model	Clock speed (GHz)	FSB speed (MT/s)	L2 cache (MB)	CPUs	Cores per CPU	Introduced	Discontinued
Xeon 5400 ("Harpertown")	Mac Pro (Early 2008)	2.80–3.20	1600	2×6	1–2	4	January 2008	March 2009
Xeon 5400 ("Harpertown")	Xserve (Early 2008)	2.80–3.00	1600	2×6	1–2	4	January 2008	April 2009
Core 2 Duo ("Penryn")	MacBook Pro (Early 2008); MacBook Pro (Late 2008); MacBook Pro (Early 2009); MacBook Pro (Mid 2009); MacBook Pro (Mid 2010)	2.26–3.06	1066	3–6	1	2	February 2008	March 2011
Core 2 Duo ("Penryn")	MacBook (Early 2008); MacBook (Late 2008); MacBook (Early 2009); MacBook (Mid 2009); MacBook (Late 2009); MacBook (Mid 2010)	2.00–2.40	1066	3	1	2	February 2008	July 2011
Core 2 Duo ("Penryn")	iMac (Early 2008) iMac (Early 2009) iMac (Mid 2009)	2.40–3.06	1066	6	1	2	April 2008	October 2009
Core 2 Duo ("Penryn")	MacBook Air (Unibody); MacBook Air (Late 2010)	1.60–2.13	1066	6	1	2	October 2008	July 2011
Core 2 Duo ("Penryn")	Mac mini (Early 2009)	2.00–2.66	1066	3	1	2	March 2009	July 2011
Core 2 Duo ("Penryn")	Mac mini Server (Late 2009)	2.53–2.66	1066	3	1	2	October 2009	July 2011
Core 2 Duo ("Wolfdale")	iMac (Late 2009)	3.06–3.33	1066–1333	3–6	1	2	October 2009	July 2010
Core 2 Duo CULV ("Penryn")	MacBook Air (Late 2010)	1.40–1.60	800	3	1	2	October 2010	July 2011

=== Nehalem ===
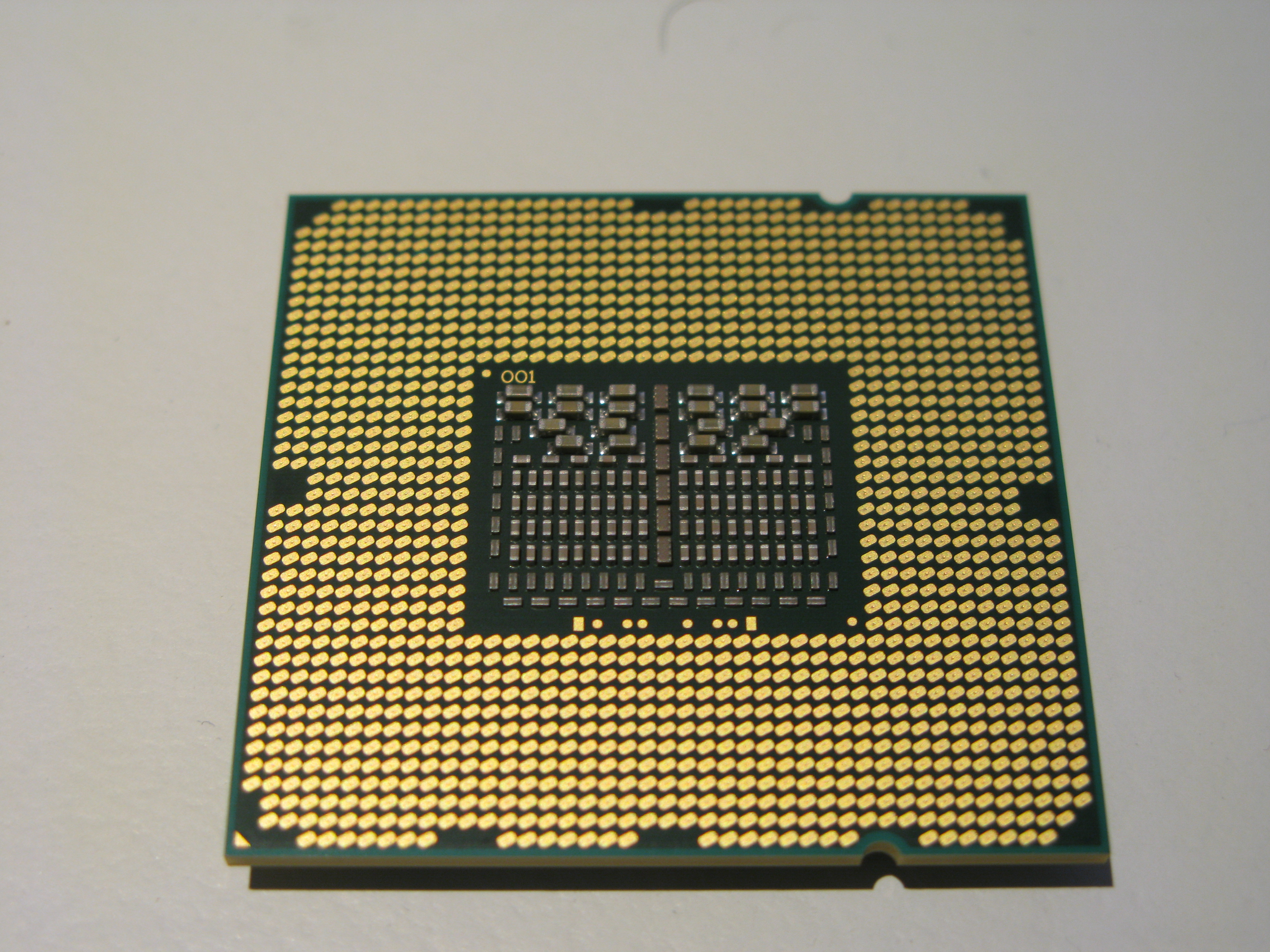
An Intel Bloomfield processor

Bloomfield and Gainestown introduced a number of notable features for the first time in any Mac processors:

- Integrated memory controllers (with on-die DMI or QPI).
- Simultaneous multithreading (branded as Hyper-threading).
- Full support for the SSE4 instruction set (SSE4.2).
- Support for Intel Turbo Boost.
- Four cores on a single die rather than a multi-chip module of two dual-core dies.

Processor	Model	Clock speed (GHz)	L2 cache (KB)	L3 cache (MB)	CPUs	Cores per CPU	QPI	HT	ITB	Introduced	Discontinued
Xeon 3500 ("Bloomfield")	Mac Pro (Early 2009)	2.66–3.33	4×256	8	1	4	Yes	Yes	Yes	March 2009	July 2010
Xeon 5500 ("Gainestown")	Mac Pro (Early 2009)	2.26–2.93	4×256	8	2	4	Yes	Yes	Yes	March 2009	August 2010
Xeon 5500 ("Gainestown")	Xserve (Early 2009)	2.26–3.33	4×256	8	1–2	4	Yes	Yes	Yes	April 2009	January 2011
Core i5 ("Lynnfield")	iMac (Late 2009)	2.66–2.80	4×256	8	1	4	No	No	Yes	October 2009	May 2011
Core i7 ("Lynnfield")	iMac (Late 2009)	2.80–2.93	4×256	8	1	4	No	Yes	Yes	October 2009	May 2011

=== Westmere ===
Arrandale introduced Intel HD Graphics, an on-die integrated GPU.

Processor	Model	Clock speed (GHz)	L2 cache (KB)	L3 cache (MB)	CPUs	Cores per CPU	QPI	HT	ITB	Introduced	Discontinued
Core i5 ("Arrandale")	MacBook Pro (Mid 2010)	2.40–2.53	2×256	3	1	2	No	Yes	Yes	April 2010	March 2011
Core i7 ("Arrandale")	MacBook Pro (Mid 2010)	2.66	2×256	4	1	2	No	Yes	Yes	April 2010	March 2011
Core i3 ("Clarkdale")	iMac (Mid 2010)	3.06–3.20	2×256	4	1	2	No	Yes	No	July 2010	May 2011
Core i5 ("Clarkdale")	iMac (Mid 2010)	3.60	2×256	4	1	2	No	Yes	Yes	July 2010	May 2011
Xeon 3600 ("Gulftown")	Mac Pro (Mid 2010); Mac Pro (Mid 2012)	3.33	6×256	12	1	6	Yes	Yes	Yes	August 2010	October 2013
Xeon 5600 ("Gulftown")	Mac Pro (Mid 2010)	2.40–3.06	4–6×256	12	2	4–6	Yes	Yes	Yes	August 2010	October 2013

=== Sandy Bridge ===
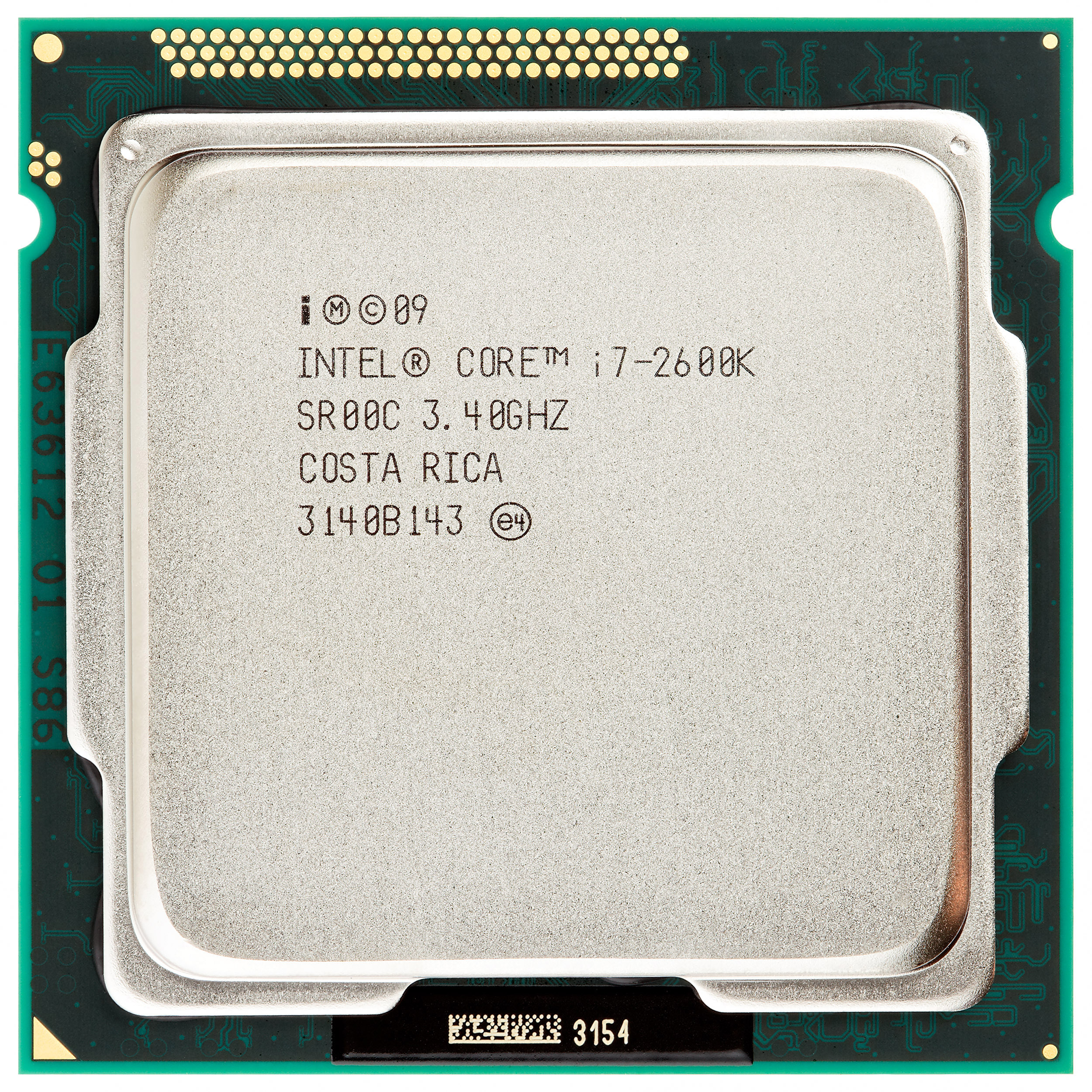
An Intel Core i7 2600K processor

Sandy Bridge added support for Intel Quick Sync Video, a dedicated on-die video encoding and decoding core. It was also the first quad-core processor to appear in a Mac notebook.

Processor	Model	Clock speed (GHz)	L2 cache (KB)	L3 cache (MB)	Cores per CPU	HT	ITB	Introduced	Discontinued
Core i5 (2-core)	MacBook Pro (Early 2011); MacBook Pro (Late 2011)	2.3	2×256	3	2	Yes	Yes	March 2011	June 2012
Core i5 (2-core)	Mac mini (Mid 2011)	2.3–2.5	2×256	3	2	Yes	Yes	July 2011	October 2012
Core i7 (2-core)	MacBook Pro (Early 2011); MacBook Pro (Late 2011)	2.7–2.8	2×256	4	2	Yes	Yes	March 2011	June 2012
Core i7 (2-core)	Mac mini (Mid 2011)	2.7	2×256	4	2	Yes	Yes	July 2011	October 2012
Core i7 (4-core)	MacBook Pro (Early 2011); MacBook Pro (Late 2011)	2.0–2.5	4×256	6–8	4	Yes	Yes	March 2011	June 2012
Core i7 (4-core)	iMac (Mid 2011)	2.8–3.4	4×256	8	4	Yes	Yes	May 2011	October 2012
Core i7 (4-core)	Mac mini Server (Mid 2011)	2.0	4×256	6	4	Yes	Yes	July 2011	October 2012
Core i5 (4-core)	iMac (Mid 2011)	2.5–3.1	4×256	6	4	No	Yes	May 2011	October 2012
Core i5 CULV (2-core)	MacBook Air (Mid 2011)	1.6–1.7	2×256	3	2	Yes	Yes	July 2011	June 2012
Core i7 CULV (2-core)	MacBook Air (Mid 2011)	1.8	2×256	4	2	Yes	Yes	July 2011	June 2012
Core i3 (2-core)	iMac (Late 2011 education only)	3.1	2×256	3	2	Yes	No	August 2011	March 2013

=== Ivy Bridge ===
Processor	Model	Clock speed (GHz)	L2 cache (KB)	L3 cache (MB)	Cores per CPU	HT	ITB	Introduced	Discontinued
Core i5 (2-core)	MacBook Pro (Mid 2012)	2.5	2×256	3	2	Yes	Yes	June 2012	October 2016
Core i5 (2-core)	Mac mini (Late 2012)	2.5	2×256	3	2	Yes	Yes	October 2012	October 2014
Core i7 (2-core)	MacBook Pro (Mid 2012)	2.9–3.0	2×256	4	2	Yes	Yes	June 2012	October 2016
Core i5 (4-core)	iMac (Late 2012)	2.7–3.2	2×256	6	4	No	Yes	October 2012	September 2013
Core i7 (4-core)	MacBook Pro (Mid 2012)	2.3–2.8	4×256	6–8	4	Yes	Yes	June 2012	October 2013
Core i7 (4-core)	iMac (Late 2012)	3.1–3.4	4×256	8	4	Yes	Yes	October 2012	September 2013
Core i7 (4-core)	Mac mini (Late 2012)	2.3–2.6	4×256	6	4	Yes	Yes	October 2012	October 2014
Core i5 CULV (2-core)	MacBook Air (Mid 2012)	1.7–1.8	2×256	3	2	Yes	Yes	June 2012	June 2013
Core i7 CULV (2-core)	MacBook Air (Mid 2012)	2.0	2×256	4	2	Yes	Yes	June 2012	June 2013
Core i3 (2-core)	iMac (Early 2013 education-only)	3.3	2×256	3	2	Yes	No	March 2013	June 2014
Xeon E5 v2	Mac Pro (Late 2013)	3.7	4×256	10	4	Yes	Yes	December 2013	April 2017
Xeon E5 v2	Mac Pro (Late 2013)	3.5	6×256	12	6	Yes	Yes	December 2013	December 2019
Xeon E5 v2	Mac Pro (Late 2013)	3.0	8×256	25	8	Yes	Yes	December 2013	December 2019
Xeon E5 v2	Mac Pro (Late 2013)	2.7	12×256	30	12	Yes	Yes	December 2013	December 2019

=== Haswell ===
The Crystal Well variant used in some MacBook Pros contains an on-package L4 cache shared between the CPU and integrated graphics.

Processor	Model	Clock speed (GHz)	L2 cache (KB)	L3 cache (MB)	L4 cache (MB)	Cores per CPU	HT	ITB	Introduced	Discontinued
Core i5 ULT (2-core)	MacBook Air (Mid 2013); MacBook Air (Early 2014)	1.3–1.4	2×256	3	—N/a	2	Yes	Yes	June 2013	March 2015
Core i5 ULT (2-core)	iMac (Mid 2014)	1.4	2×256	3	—N/a	2	Yes	Yes	June 2014	October 2015
Core i5 ULT (2-core)	Mac mini (Late 2014)	1.4–2.8	2×256	3	—N/a	2	Yes	Yes	October 2014	October 2018
Core i7 ULT (2-core)	MacBook Air (Mid 2013); MacBook Air (Early 2014)	1.7	2×256	4	—N/a	2	Yes	Yes	June 2013	March 2015
Core i7 ULT (2-core)	Mac mini (Late 2014)	3.0	2×256	4	—N/a	2	Yes	Yes	October 2014	October 2018
Core i5 (4-core)	iMac (Late 2013)	2.7–3.5	4×256	4–6	—N/a	4	No	Yes	September 2013	October 2015
Core i7 (4-core)	iMac (Late 2013)	3.1–4.0	4×256	8	—N/a	4	Yes	Yes	September 2013	October 2015
Core i7 (4-core)	MacBook Pro (Late 2013); MacBook Pro (Mid 2014); MacBook Pro (Mid 2015)	2.0–2.8	4×256	6	128	4	Yes	Yes	October 2013	July 2018
Core i5 (2-core)	MacBook Pro (Late 2013); MacBook Pro (Mid 2014)	2.4–2.8	2×256	3	—N/a	2	Yes	Yes	October 2013	March 2015
Core i7 (2-core)	MacBook Pro (Late 2013); MacBook Pro (Mid 2014)	2.8–3.0	2×256	4	—N/a	2	Yes	Yes	October 2013	March 2015

=== Broadwell ===
Processor	Model	Clock speed (GHz)	L2 cache (KB)	L3 cache (MB)	L4 cache (MB)	Cores per CPU	HT	ITB	Introduced	Discontinued
Core M	MacBook (Early 2015)	1.1–1.3	2×256	4	—N/a	2	Yes	Yes	April 2015	April 2016
Core i5 ULT (2-core)	MacBook Air (Early 2015); MacBook Air (2017)	1.6–1.8	2×256	3	—N/a	2	Yes	Yes	March 2015	July 2019
Core i5 ULT (2-core)	iMac (Late 2015)	1.6	2×256	3	—N/a	2	Yes	Yes	October 2015	June 2017
Core i7 ULT (2-core)	MacBook Air (Early 2015); MacBook Air (2017)	2.2	2×256	4	—N/a	2	Yes	Yes	March 2015	July 2019
Core i5 (2-core)	MacBook Pro (Early 2015)	2.7–2.9	2×256	3	—N/a	2	Yes	Yes	March 2015	June 2017
Core i7 (2-core)	MacBook Pro (Early 2015)	3.1	2×256	4	—N/a	2	Yes	Yes	March 2015	June 2017
Core i5 (4-core)	iMac (Late 2015)	2.8–3.1	4×256	4	128	4	No	Yes	October 2015	June 2017
Core i7 (4-core)	iMac (Late 2015)	3.3	4×256	6	128	4	Yes	Yes	October 2015	June 2017

=== Skylake ===
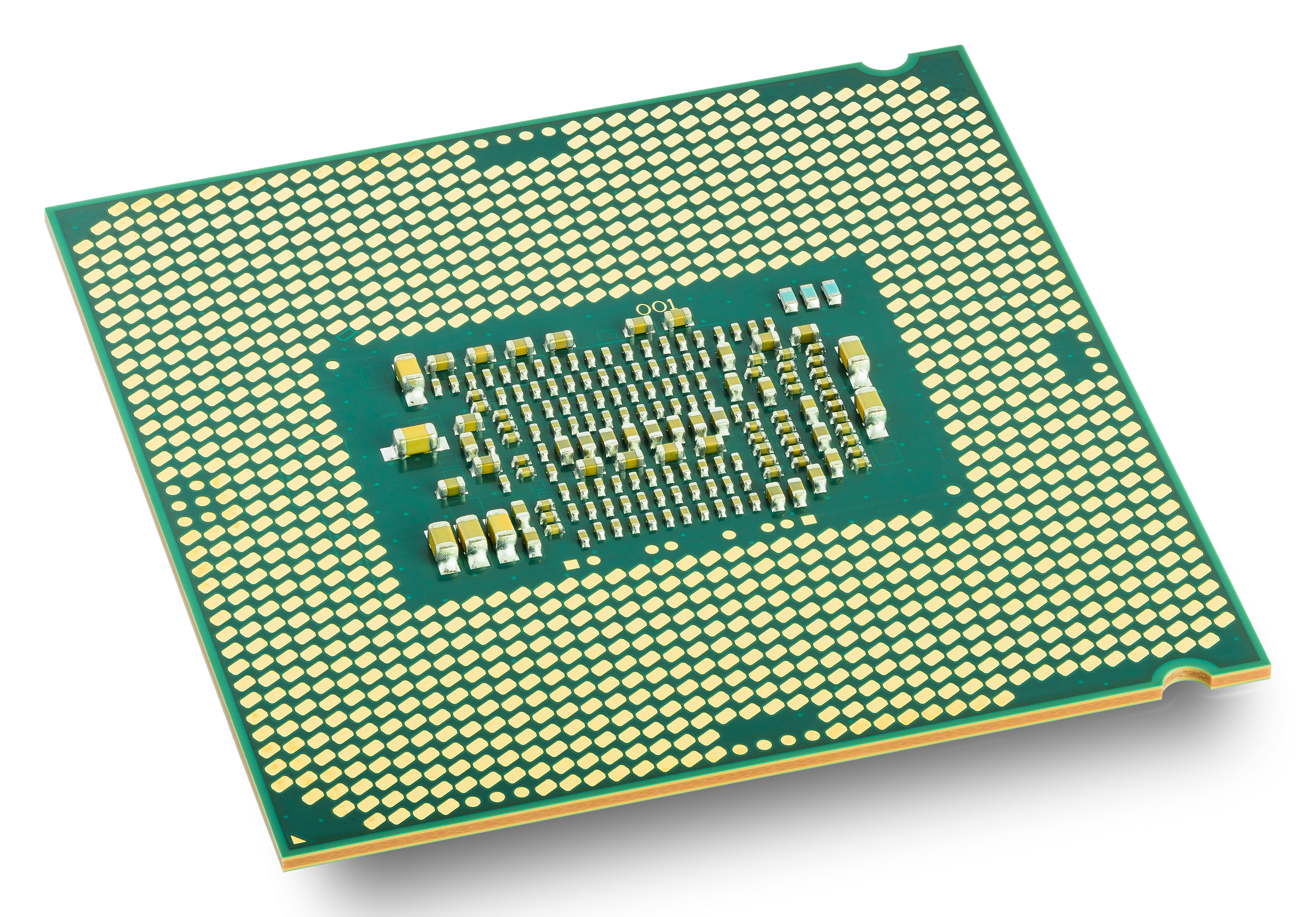
An Intel Core i7 6700K processor

Processor	Model	Clock speed (GHz)	L2 cache (KB)	L3 cache (MB)	L4 cache (MB)	Cores per CPU	HT	ITB	Introduced	Discontinued
Core m3, m5, m7	MacBook (Early 2016)	1.1–1.3	2×256	4	—N/a	2	Yes	Yes	April 2016	June 2017
Core i5 (4-core)	iMac (Late 2015)	3.2–3.3	4×256	6	—N/a	4	No	Yes	October 2015	June 2017
Core i7 (4-core)	iMac (Late 2015)	4.0	4×256	8	—N/a	4	Yes	Yes	October 2015	June 2017
Core i7 (4-core)	MacBook Pro (2016)	2.6–2.9	4×256	6–8	—N/a	4	Yes	Yes	November 2016	June 2017
Core i5 (2-core)	MacBook Pro (2016)	2.0	2×256	4	64	2	Yes	Yes	October 2016	June 2017
Core i5 (2-core)	MacBook Pro (2016)	2.9–3.1	2×256	4	64	2	Yes	Yes	November 2016	June 2017
Core i7 (2-core)	MacBook Pro (2016)	2.4	2×256	4	—N/a	2	Yes	Yes	October 2016	June 2017
Core i7 (2-core)	MacBook Pro (2016)	3.3	2×256	4	64	2	Yes	Yes	November 2016	June 2017
Xeon W	iMac Pro (2017)	2.3	18×1024	24.75	—N/a	18	Yes	Yes	December 2017	March 2021
Xeon W	iMac Pro (2017)	2.5	14×1024	19.25	—N/a	14	Yes	Yes	December 2017	March 2021
Xeon W	iMac Pro (2017)	3.0	10×1024	13.75	—N/a	10	Yes	Yes	December 2017	March 2021
Xeon W	iMac Pro (2017)	3.2	8×1024	11	—N/a	8	Yes	Yes	December 2017	March 2021

=== Kaby Lake ===
Processor	Model	Clock speed (GHz)	L2 cache (KB)	L3 cache (MB)	L4 cache (MB)	TDP (W)	Cores per CPU	HT	ITB	Introduced	Discontinued
Core m3	MacBook (2017)	1.2	2×256	4	—N/a	4.5	2	Yes	Yes	June 2017	July 2019
Core i5 (2-core)	MacBook (2017) (Note: Uses an ultra low-voltage processor previously branded as Core M.)	1.3	2×256	4	—N/a	4.5	2	Yes	Yes	June 2017	July 2019
Core i5 (2-core)	MacBook Air (2018); MacBook Air (2019)	1.6	2×256	4	—N/a	7	2	Yes	Yes	October 2018	March 2020
Core i5 (2-core)	iMac (2017)	2.3	2×256	4	64	15	2	Yes	Yes	June 2017	October 2021
Core i5 (2-core)	MacBook Pro (2017)	2.3	2×256	4	64	15	2	Yes	Yes	June 2017	July 2019
Core i5 (2-core)	MacBook Pro (2017)	3.1–3.3	2×256	4	64	28	2	Yes	Yes	June 2017	July 2018
Core i7 (2-core)	MacBook (2017)	1.4	2×256	4	—N/a	4.5	2	Yes	Yes	June 2017	July 2019
Core i7 (2-core)	MacBook Pro (2017)	2.5	2×256	4	—N/a	15	2	Yes	Yes	June 2017	July 2019
Core i7 (2-core)	MacBook Pro (2017)	3.5	2×256	4	64	28	2	Yes	Yes	June 2017	July 2018
Core i5 (4-core)	iMac (2017)	3.0–3.8	4×256	6	—N/a	65–91	4	No	Yes	June 2017	March 2019
Core i7 (4-core)	iMac (2017)	3.6–4.2	4×256	8	—N/a	65–91	4	Yes	Yes	June 2017	March 2019
Core i7 (4-core)	MacBook Pro (2017)	2.8–2.9	4×256	6–8	—N/a	45	4	Yes	Yes	June 2017	July 2018

=== Coffee Lake ===
Coffee Lake was the first 6-core processor to appear in a Mac notebook.

Processor	Model	Clock speed (GHz)	L2 cache (KB)	L3 cache (MB)	L4 cache (MB)	TDP (W)	Cores per CPU	HT	ITB	Introduced	Discontinued
Core i5 (4-core)	MacBook Pro (2018); MacBook Pro (2019)	2.3–2.4	4×256	6	128	28	4	Yes	Yes	July 2018	May 2020
Core i5 (4-core)	MacBook Pro (2019); MacBook Pro (2020)	1.4	4×256	6	128	15	4	Yes	Yes	July 2019	November 2020
Core i7 (4-core)	MacBook Pro (2018); MacBook Pro (2019)	2.7–2.8	4×256	8	128	28	4	Yes	Yes	July 2018	May 2020
Core i7 (4-core)	MacBook Pro (2019); MacBook Pro (2020)	1.7	4×256	8	128	15	4	Yes	Yes	July 2019	November 2020
Core i3 (4-core)	Mac Mini (2018)	3.6	4×256	6	—N/a	65	4	No	No	November 2018	November 2020
Core i3 (4-core)	iMac (2019)	3.6	4×256	6	—N/a	65	4	No	No	March 2019	April 2021
Core i5 (6-core)	Mac Mini (2018)	3.0	6×256	9	—N/a	65	6	No	Yes	November 2018	January 2023
Core i5 (6-core)	iMac (2019)	3.0–3.1	6×256	9	—N/a	65	6	No	Yes	March 2019	April 2021
Core i5 (6-core)	iMac (2019)	3.7	6×256	9	—N/a	95	6	No	Yes	March 2019	August 2020
Core i7 (6-core)	MacBook Pro (2018)	2.2–2.6	6×256	9	—N/a	45	6	Yes	Yes	July 2018	May 2019
Core i7 (6-core)	MacBook Pro (2019)	2.6	6×256	12	—N/a	45	6	Yes	Yes	May 2019	October 2021
Core i7 (6-core)	Mac Mini (2018)	3.2	6×256	12	—N/a	65	6	Yes	Yes	November 2018	January 2023
Core i7 (6-core)	iMac (2019)	3.2	6×256	12	—N/a	65	6	Yes	Yes	March 2019	April 2021
Core i9 (6-core)	MacBook Pro (2018)	2.9	6×256	12	—N/a	45	6	Yes	Yes	July 2018	May 2019
Core i9 (8-core)	iMac (2019)	3.6	8×256	16	—N/a	95	8	Yes	Yes	March 2019	August 2020
Core i9 (8-core)	MacBook Pro (2019)	2.3–2.4	8×256	16	—N/a	45	8	Yes	Yes	May 2019	October 2021

=== Cascade Lake ===
Processor	Model	Clock speed (GHz)	L2 cache (KB)	L3 cache (MB)	TDP (W)	Cores per CPU	HT	ITB	Introduced	Discontinued
Xeon W	Mac Pro (2019)	2.5	28×1024	38.5	205	28	Yes	Yes	December 2019	June 2023
Xeon W	Mac Pro (2019)	2.7	28×1024	33	205	24	Yes	Yes	December 2019	June 2023
Xeon W	Mac Pro (2019)	3.2	16×1024	22	205	16	Yes	Yes	December 2019	June 2023
Xeon W	Mac Pro (2019)	3.3	12×1024	19.25	180	12	Yes	Yes	December 2019	June 2023
Xeon W	Mac Pro (2019)	3.5	8×1024	16.5	160	8	Yes	Yes	December 2019	June 2023

=== Comet Lake ===
Processor	Model	Clock speed (GHz)	L2 cache (KB)	L3 cache (MB)	TDP (W)	Cores per CPU	HT	ITB	Introduced	Discontinued
Core i5 (6-core)	iMac (2020)	3.1–3.3	6×256	12	65	6	Yes	Yes	August 2020	March 2022
Core i7 (8-core)	iMac (2020)	3.8	8×256	16	125	8	Yes	Yes	August 2020	March 2022
Core i9 (10-core)	iMac (2020)	3.6	10×256	20	125	10	Yes	Yes	August 2020	March 2022

=== Ice Lake ===
Ice Lake (Sunny Cove) is a 10th generation chip.

Processor	Model	Clock speed (GHz)	L2 cache (KB)	L3 cache (MB)	TDP (W)	Cores per CPU	HT	ITB	Introduced	Discontinued
Core i3 (2-core)	MacBook Air (2020)	1.1	2×512	4	9	2	Yes	Yes	March 2020	November 2020
Core i5 (4-core)	MacBook Air (2020)	1.1	4×512	6	10	4	Yes	Yes	March 2020	November 2020
Core i5 (4-core)	MacBook Pro (2020)	2.0	4×512	6	28	4	Yes	Yes	May 2020	October 2021
Core i7 (4-core)	MacBook Air (2020)	1.2	4×512	8	10	4	Yes	Yes	March 2020	November 2020
Core i7 (4-core)	MacBook Pro (2020)	2.3	4×512	8	28	4	Yes	Yes	May 2020	October 2021

== Apple silicon ==
Source: Haslam, Karen, Mac processor comparison: Apple Silicon vs Intel

=== M1 ===
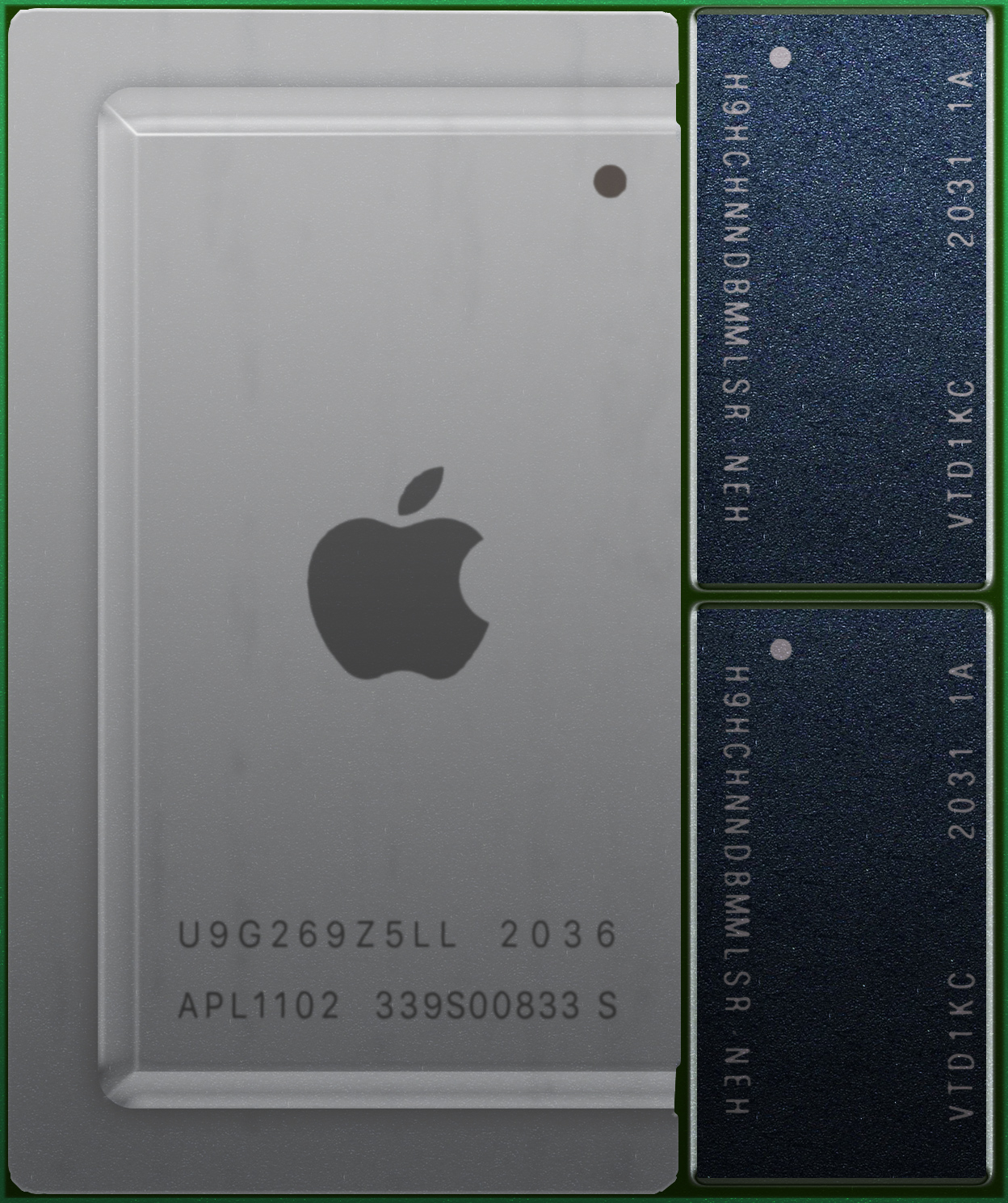
An Apple M1 processor

The M1 is a system on a chip fabricated by TSMC on the 5 nm process and contains 16 billion transistors. Its CPU cores are the first to be used in a Mac processor designed by Apple and the first to use the ARM instruction set architecture. It has 8 CPU cores (4 performance and 4 efficiency), up to 8 GPU cores, and a 16-core Neural Engine, as well as LPDDR4X memory with a bandwidth of 68 GB/s.

The M1 Pro and M1 Max SoCs have 10 CPU cores (8 performance and 2 efficiency) and a 16-core and 32-core GPU, respectively. Both chips were first introduced in the MacBook Pro in October 2021.

The M1 Ultra is a processor combining two M1 Max chips in one package. It was available in the highest-end variants of the Mac Studio, released on March 18, 2022. All parameters of the M1 Max are doubled in M1 Ultra processors; they are, however, packed as one processor package (larger than a Socket AM4 AMD Ryzen processor) and seen as one processor in macOS.

Processor	Model	CPU cores	GPU cores	NPU cores	Introduced	Discontinued
M1	iMac (24-inch, M1, 2021)	8	7–8	16	May 2021	October 2023
M1	Mac mini (M1, 2020)	8	8	16	November 2020	January 2023
M1	MacBook Air (M1, 2020)	8	7–8	16	November 2020	March 2024
M1	MacBook Pro (13-inch, M1, 2020)	8	8	16	November 2020	June 2022
M1 Pro	MacBook Pro (14-inch, 2021)	8–10	14–16	16	October 2021	January 2023
M1 Pro	MacBook Pro (16-inch, 2021)	10	16	16	October 2021	January 2023
M1 Max	MacBook Pro (14-inch, 2021); MacBook Pro (16-inch, 2021)	10	24–32	16	October 2021	January 2023
M1 Max	Mac Studio (2022)	10	24–32	16	March 2022	June 2023
M1 Ultra	Mac Studio (2022)	20	48–64	32	March 2022	June 2023

=== M2 ===
The M2 is a system on a chip fabricated by TSMC on an enhanced 5 nm process, containing 20 billion transistors. It has 8 CPU cores (4 performance and 4 efficiency), up to 10 GPU cores, and a 16 core Neural Engine, as well as LPDDR5 memory with a bandwidth of 100 GB/s.

The M2 Pro and M2 Max have 12 CPU cores (8 performance and 4 efficiency), and a 19-core and 38-core GPU respectively. Both chips were first introduced in the MacBook Pro in January 2023.

The M2 Ultra is a processor combining two M2 Max dies in one package. It is available in the highest-end variants of the Mac Studio as well as the Mac Pro, both released on June 13, 2023.

Processor	Model	CPU cores	GPU cores	NPU cores	Introduced	Discontinued
M2	MacBook Air (M2, 2022)	8	8–10	16	July 2022	March 2025
M2	MacBook Pro (13-inch, M2, 2022)	8	10	16	June 2022	October 2023
M2	Mac mini (2023)	8	10	16	January 2023	October 2024
M2	MacBook Air (15-inch, M2, 2023)	8	10	16	June 2023	March 2024
M2 Pro	Mac mini (2023)	10–12	16–19	16	January 2023	October 2024
M2 Pro	MacBook Pro (14-inch, 2023)	10–12	16–19	16	January 2023	October 2023
M2 Pro	MacBook Pro (16-inch, 2023)	12	19	16	January 2023	October 2023
M2 Max	MacBook Pro (14-inch, 2023); MacBook Pro (16-inch, 2023)	12	30–38	16	January 2023	October 2023
M2 Max	Mac Studio (2023)	12	30–38	16	June 2023	March 2025
M2 Ultra	Mac Studio (2023)	24	60–76	32	June 2023	March 2025
M2 Ultra	Mac Pro (2023)	24	60–76	32	June 2023	March 2026

=== M3 ===
The M3 is a system on a chip fabricated by TSMC on the 3 nm process, containing 25 billion transistors. It has 8 CPU cores (4 performance and 4 efficiency), up to 10 GPU cores, and a 16 core Neural Engine, as well as LPDDR5 memory with a bandwidth of 100 GB/s.

The M3 Pro has 12 CPU cores (6 performance and 6 efficiency), while the M3 Max has 16 CPU cores (12 performance and 4 efficiency); they have an 18-core and 40-core GPU respectively. Both chips were first introduced in the MacBook Pro in October 2023.

The M3 Ultra is a processor combining two M3 Max dies in one package. It is available in the highest-end variants of the Mac Studio, released on March 12, 2025.

Processor	Model	CPU cores	GPU cores	NPU cores	Introduced	Discontinued
M3	iMac (24-inch, 2023)	8	8–10	16	November 2023	October 2024
M3	MacBook Pro (14-inch, M3, 2023)	8	10	16	November 2023	October 2024
M3	MacBook Air (13-inch, M3, 2024)	8	8–10	16	March 2024	March 2025
M3	MacBook Air (15-inch, M3, 2024)	8	10	16	March 2024	March 2025
M3 Pro	MacBook Pro (14-inch, M3 Pro, 2023)	11–12	14–18	16	November 2023	October 2024
M3 Pro	MacBook Pro (16-inch, 2023)	12	18	16	November 2023	October 2024
M3 Max	MacBook Pro (14-inch, M3 Max, 2023); MacBook Pro (16-inch, 2023)	14–16	30–40	16	November 2023	October 2024
M3 Ultra	Mac Studio (2025)	28–32	60–80	32	March 2025	August 2026

=== M4 and A18 Pro ===
The M4 is a system on a chip fabricated by TSMC on an enhanced 3 nm process, containing 28 billion transistors. It has up to 10 CPU cores (4 performance and 6 efficiency), up to 10 GPU cores, and a 16 core Neural Engine, as well as LPDDR5X memory with a bandwidth of 120 GB/s.

The M4 Pro has 14 CPU cores (10 performance and 4 efficiency), while the M4 Max has 16 CPU cores (12 performance and 4 efficiency); they have a 20-core and 40-core GPU respectively. Both chips were first introduced in the MacBook Pro in October 2024.

The A18 Pro is derived from the M4 line. The variant used in the MacBook Neo has 6 CPU cores (2 performance and 4 efficiency) and 5 GPU cores. The chip was introduced to the MacBook Neo in March 2026, notably making it the first time an A-series SoC is used in a Mac.

Processor	Model	CPU cores	GPU cores	NPU cores	Introduced	Discontinued
A18 Pro	MacBook Neo (2026)	6	5	16	March 2026	Not Yet
M4	iMac (24-inch, 2024)	8–10	8–10	16	November 2024	October 2026
M4	MacBook Pro (14-inch, M4, 2024)	10	10	16	November 2024	October 2025
M4	Mac mini (2024)	10	10	16	November 2024	August 2026
M4	MacBook Air (13-inch, M4, 2025)	10	8–10	16	March 2025	March 2026
M4	MacBook Air (15-inch, M4, 2025)	10	10	16	March 2025	March 2026
M4 Pro	Mac mini (2024)	12–14	16–20	16	November 2024	August 2026
M4 Pro	MacBook Pro (14-inch, M4 Pro, 2024)	12–14	16–20	16	November 2024	March 2026
M4 Pro	MacBook Pro (16-inch, 2024)	14	20	16	November 2024	March 2026
M4 Max	MacBook Pro (14-inch, M4 Max, 2024); MacBook Pro (16-inch, 2024)	14–16	32–40	16	November 2024	March 2026
M4 Max	Mac Studio (2025)	14–16	32–40	16	March 2025	August 2026

=== M5 ===
The M5 is a system on a chip fabricated by TSMC on a third-generation 3 nm process. It has 10 CPU cores (4 performance and 6 efficiency), up to 10 GPU cores, and a 16 core Neural Engine, as well as LPDDR5X memory with a bandwidth of 153 GB/s. It was first introduced in the MacBook Pro in October 2025.

The M5 Pro and M5 Max have 18 CPU cores (6 "super" and 12 performance); they have a 20-core and 40-core GPU respectively. Both chips were first introduced in the MacBook Pro in March 2026.

The M5 Ultra is a processor combining two M5 Max dies in one package. It is available in the highest-end variants of the Mac Studio, released on September 22, 2026.

Processor	Model	CPU cores	GPU cores	NPU cores	Introduced	Discontinued
M5	MacBook Pro (14-inch, M5)	10	10	16	October 2025	October 2026
M5	MacBook Air (13-inch, M5)	10	8–10	16	March 2026	Not Yet
M5	MacBook Air (15-inch, M5)	10	10	16	March 2026	Not Yet
M5 Pro	MacBook Pro (14-inch, M5 Pro)	15–18	16–20	16	March 2026	Not Yet
M5 Pro	MacBook Pro (16-inch, M5 Pro)	18	20	16	March 2026	Not Yet
M5 Pro	Mac mini (M5 Pro)	15–18	16–20	16	September 2026	Not Yet
M5 Max	MacBook Pro (14-inch, M5 Max); MacBook Pro (16-inch, M5 Max)	18	32–40	16	March 2026	Not Yet
M5 Max	Mac Studio (M5 Max)	18	32–40	16	September 2026	Not Yet
M5 Ultra	Mac Studio (M5 Ultra)	30–36	64–80	32	September 2026	Not Yet

=== M6 ===
The M6 is a system on a chip fabricated by TSMC on a 2 nm process. It has up to 12 CPU cores (2 super, 4 performance, and 6 efficiency), up to 12 GPU cores, and a dual 16 core Neural Engine, as well as LPDDR5X memory with a bandwidth of up to 170 GB/s.

Processor	Model	CPU cores	GPU cores	NPU cores	Introduced	Discontinued
M6	Mac mini (M6)	12	12	32	September 2026	Not Yet
M6	iMac (24-inch, M6)	10–12	10–12	32	November 2026	Not Yet
M6	MacBook Pro (14-inch, M6)	12	12	32	November 2026	Not Yet

== See also ==
- Mac (computer)
- List of Mac models
- macOS version history

== Sources ==
- Specifications, Apple, Inc.
- Ian Page and contributors, MacTracker.
- Glen Sanford, Apple History, apple-history.com.
- Dan Knight, Computer Profiles, LowEndMac, Cobweb Publishing, Inc.
- Product Specifications, Intel, Inc.
